See also the List of Lycosidae genera, sorted by subfamilies.
This page lists all described species of the spider family Lycosidae as of Dec. 29, 2013.

Acantholycosa
Acantholycosa Dahl, 1908
 Acantholycosa aborigenica Zyuzin & Marusik, 1988 — Russia, Mongolia
 Acantholycosa altaiensis Marusik, Azarkina & Koponen, 2004 — Russia
 Acantholycosa azarkinae Marusik & Omelko, 2011 — Russia
 Acantholycosa azheganovae (Lobanova, 1978) — Russia
 Acantholycosa azyuzini Marusik, Hippa & Koponen, 1996 — Russia
 Acantholycosa baltoroi (Caporiacco, 1935) — Kashmir, Nepal, China
 Acantholycosa dudkoromani Marusik, Azarkina & Koponen, 2004 — Russia
 Acantholycosa dudkorum Marusik, Azarkina & Koponen, 2004 — Russia
 Acantholycosa katunensis Marusik, Azarkina & Koponen, 2004 — Russia
 Acantholycosa khakassica Marusik, Azarkina & Koponen, 2004 — Russia
 Acantholycosa kurchumensis Marusik, Azarkina & Koponen, 2004 — Kazakhstan
 Acantholycosa levinae Marusik, Azarkina & Koponen, 2004 — Russia
 Acantholycosa lignaria (Clerck, 1757) — Palearctic
 Acantholycosa logunovi Marusik, Azarkina & Koponen, 2004 — Russia
 Acantholycosa mordkovitchi Marusik, Azarkina & Koponen, 2004 — Russia
 Acantholycosa norvegica (Thorell, 1872) — Palearctic
 Acantholycosa norvegica sudetica (L. Koch, 1875) — Europe
 Acantholycosa oligerae Marusik, Azarkina & Koponen, 2004 — Russia
 Acantholycosa paraplumalis Marusik, Azarkina & Koponen, 2004 — Russia
 Acantholycosa pedestris (Simon, 1876) — Europe
 Acantholycosa petrophila Marusik, Azarkina & Koponen, 2004 — Russia
 Acantholycosa plumalis Marusik, Azarkina & Koponen, 2004 — Russia
 Acantholycosa sayanensis Marusik, Azarkina & Koponen, 2004 — Russia
 Acantholycosa solituda (Levi & Levi, 1951) — USA, Canada
 Acantholycosa spinembolus Marusik, Azarkina & Koponen, 2004 — Russia
 Acantholycosa sterneri (Marusik, 1993) — Russia, Mongolia
 Acantholycosa sundukovi Marusik, Azarkina & Koponen, 2004 — Russia
 Acantholycosa tarbagataica Marusik & Logunov, 2011 — Kazakhstan
 Acantholycosa zinchenkoi Marusik, Azarkina & Koponen, 2004 — Russia, Kazakhstan

Adelocosa
Adelocosa Gertsch, 1973
 Adelocosa anops Gertsch, 1973 — Hawaii

Agalenocosa
Agalenocosa Mello-Leitao, 1944
 Agalenocosa bryantae (Roewer, 1951) — Hispaniola
 Agalenocosa chacoensis (Mello-Leitao, 1942) — Argentina
 Agalenocosa denisi (Caporiacco, 1947) — Guyana
 Agalenocosa fallax (L. Koch, 1877) — Queensland
 Agalenocosa fimbriata Mello-Leitao, 1944 — Argentina
 Agalenocosa gentilis Mello-Leitao, 1944 — Argentina
 Agalenocosa helvola (C. L. Koch, 1847) — Mexico, Colombia
 Agalenocosa kolbei (Dahl, 1908) — Bismarck Archipel
 Agalenocosa luteonigra (Mello-Leitao, 1945) — Argentina
 Agalenocosa melanotaenia (Mello-Leitao, 1941) — Argentina
 Agalenocosa pickeli (Mello-Leitao, 1937) — Brazil
 Agalenocosa punctata Mello-Leitao, 1944 — Argentina
 Agalenocosa singularis Mello-Leitao, 1944 — Argentina
 Agalenocosa subinermis (Simon, 1897) — India
 Agalenocosa yaucensis (Petrunkevitch, 1929) — Puerto Rico

Aglaoctenus
Aglaoctenus Tullgren, 1905
 Aglaoctenus castaneus (Mello-Leitao, 1942) — Brazil, Ecuador, Peru, Argentina
 Aglaoctenus lagotis (Holmberg, 1876) — Colombia to Argentina
 Aglaoctenus oblongus (C. L. Koch, 1847) — Brazil, Uruguay, Argentina
 Aglaoctenus puyen Piacentini, 2011 — Argentina
 Aglaoctenus yacytata Piacentini, 2011 — Argentina

Algidus
Algidus Simon, 1898
 Algidus marmoratus Simon, 1898 — Venezuela

Allocosa
Allocosa Banks, 1900
 Allocosa abmingani (Hickman, 1944) — South Australia
 Allocosa absoluta (Gertsch, 1934) — USA, Mexico
 Allocosa adolphifriederici (Strand, 1913) — Central, East Africa, Zanzibar
 Allocosa albiconspersa Roewer, 1959 — Rwanda
 Allocosa albonotata (Schmidt, 1895) — Russia
 Allocosa algoensis (Pocock, 1900) — South Africa
 Allocosa alticeps (Mello-Leitao, 1944) — Argentina
 Allocosa apora (Gertsch, 1934) — USA to Costa Rica
 Allocosa aurata (Purcell, 1903) — South Africa
 Allocosa aurichelis Roewer, 1959 — South Africa
 Allocosa bersabae Roewer, 1959 — Namibia
 Allocosa biserialis Roewer, 1959 — Congo
 Allocosa brasiliensis (Petrunkevitch, 1910) — Brazil, Uruguay, Argentina, Chile
 Allocosa caboverdensis Schmidt & Krause, 1995 — Cape Verde Islands
 Allocosa calamarica (Strand, 1914) — Colombia
 Allocosa cambridgei (Simon, 1876) — Turkey, Syria
 Allocosa chamberlini (Gertsch, 1934) — USA
 Allocosa clariventris (Guy, 1966) — Morocco
 Allocosa comotti (Thorell, 1887) — Myanmar
 Allocosa danneili (Dahl, 1908) — Bismarck Archipel
 Allocosa delagoa Roewer, 1959 — Mozambique
 Allocosa delesserti (Caporiacco, 1941) — Ethiopia
 Allocosa deserticola (Simon, 1898) — Egypt
 Allocosa dingosaeformis (Guy, 1966) — Morocco
 Allocosa dubia (Walckenaer, 1837) — Brazil
 Allocosa dufouri (Simon, 1876) — Portugal, Spain
 Allocosa edeala Roewer, 1959 — Cameroon
 Allocosa efficiens Roewer, 1959 — Congo, Rwanda
 Allocosa excusor (L. Koch, 1867) — Queensland
 Allocosa exserta Roewer, 1959 — Botswana, South Africa
 Allocosa faberrima (Simon, 1910) — Namibia
 Allocosa finkei (Hickman, 1944) — South Australia
 Allocosa flavisternis (L. Koch, 1877) — Queensland, New South Wales
 Allocosa floridiana (Chamberlin, 1908) — USA
 Allocosa funerea (Hentz, 1844) — USA
 Allocosa furtiva (Gertsch, 1934) — USA
 Allocosa gabesia Roewer, 1959 — Tunisia
 Allocosa glochidea Roewer, 1959 — Namibia
 Allocosa gorontalensis (Merian, 1911) — Sulawesi
 Allocosa gracilitarsis (Purcell, 1903) — South Africa
 Allocosa guianensis (Caporiacco, 1947) — Guyana
 Allocosa halei (Hickman, 1944) — Northern Territory
 Allocosa handschini (Schenkel, 1937) — Morocco
 Allocosa hasselti (L. Koch, 1877) — Queensland, South Australia
 Allocosa hirsuta (Bösenberg & Lenz, 1895) — Central, East Africa
 Allocosa hostilis (L. Koch, 1877) — Fiji
 Allocosa hugonis (Strand, 1911) — Aru Islands
 Allocosa illegalis (Strand, 1906) — Ethiopia
 Allocosa ituriana (Strand, 1913) — Central Africa
 Allocosa iturianella Roewer, 1959 — Kenya, Uganda
 Allocosa kalaharensis (Simon, 1910) — Namibia, South Africa
 Allocosa karissimbica (Strand, 1913) — Central, East Africa
 Allocosa kazibana Roewer, 1959 — Congo, Rwanda, Tanzania
 Allocosa kulagini (Spassky, 1941) — Tajikistan
 Allocosa laetella (Strand, 1907) — Moluccas
 Allocosa lawrencei (Roewer, 1951) — South Africa
 Allocosa leucotricha Roewer, 1959 — Congo
 Allocosa lombokensis (Strand, 1913) — Lombok
 Allocosa mafensis (Lawrence, 1927) — Namibia
 Allocosa mahengea Roewer, 1959 — Tanzania
 Allocosa manmaka Roewer, 1960 — Afghanistan
 Allocosa maroccana Roewer, 1959 — Morocco
 Allocosa marshalli (Pocock, 1901) — South Africa
 Allocosa martinicensis (Strand, 1910) — Martinique
 Allocosa marua Roewer, 1959 — Cameroon
 Allocosa mascatensis (Simon, 1898) — Oman
 Allocosa mexicana (Banks, 1898) — Mexico
 Allocosa millica (Strand, 1906) — USA
 Allocosa mirabilis (Strand, 1906) — Ethiopia
 Allocosa mogadorensis (Simon, 1909) — Morocco
 Allocosa mokiensis Gertsch, 1934 — USA
 Allocosa molicola (Strand, 1906) — Ethiopia
 Allocosa montana Roewer, 1959 — Tanzania
 Allocosa morelosiana (Gertsch & Davis, 1940) — USA, Mexico
 Allocosa mossambica Roewer, 1959 — Mozambique
 Allocosa mossamedesa Roewer, 1959 — Angola
 Allocosa mulaiki (Gertsch, 1934) — USA
 Allocosa mutilata Mello-Leitao, 1937 — Brazil
 Allocosa nanahuensis (Badcock, 1932) — Paraguay
 Allocosa nebulosa Roewer, 1959 — Congo
 Allocosa nigella (Caporiacco, 1940) — Ethiopia
 Allocosa nigripes (Guy, 1966) — Morocco
 Allocosa nigriventris (Guy, 1966) — Morocco
 Allocosa nigrofulva (Caporiacco, 1955) — Venezuela
 Allocosa noctuabunda (Montgomery, 1904) — USA, Mexico
 Allocosa obscuroides (Strand, 1906) — Java, Australia
 Allocosa obturata (Lawrence, 1928) — Namibia
 Allocosa olivieri (Simon, 1876) — Syria, Israel
 Allocosa orinus (Chamberlin, 1916) — Peru
 Allocosa otavia Roewer, 1959 — Namibia
 Allocosa palabunda (L. Koch, 1877) — Australia, New Caledonia
 Allocosa pallideflava (Lawrence, 1936) — Namibia
 Allocosa panamena Chamberlin, 1925 — Mexico to Ecuador
 Allocosa paraguayensis (Roewer, 1951) — Paraguay
 Allocosa pardala (Strand, 1909) — Brazil
 Allocosa parva (Banks, 1894) — USA to Costa Rica
 Allocosa parvivulva (Lawrence, 1927) — Namibia
 Allocosa pellita Roewer, 1960 — Afghanistan
 Allocosa perfecta Roewer, 1959 — Namibia
 Allocosa pistia (Strand, 1913) — Central, East Africa
 Allocosa plumipes Roewer, 1959 — Tanzania
 Allocosa pugnatrix (Keyserling, 1877) — Central America, West Indies
 Allocosa pulchella Roewer, 1959 — Namibia
 Allocosa pylora Chamberlin, 1925 — USA
 Allocosa quadrativulva (Caporiacco, 1955) — Venezuela
 Allocosa retenta (Gertsch & Wallace, 1935) — USA
 Allocosa ruwenzorensis (Strand, 1913) — East Africa
 Allocosa samoana (Roewer, 1951) — Samoa
 Allocosa sangtoda Roewer, 1960 — Afghanistan
 Allocosa schoenlandi (Pocock, 1900) — South Africa
 Allocosa schubotzi (Strand, 1913) — Rwanda
 Allocosa sefrana (Schenkel, 1937) — Algeria
 Allocosa sennaris Roewer, 1959 — Sudan
 Allocosa sjostedti (Lessert, 1926) — East Africa, Rwanda
 Allocosa soluta (Tullgren, 1905) — Bolivia
 Allocosa sublata (Montgomery, 1902) — USA
 Allocosa suboculata Guy, 1966 — North Africa
 Allocosa subparva Dondale & Redner, 1983 — USA, Mexico
 Allocosa tagax (Thorell, 1897) — Myanmar
 Allocosa tangana Roewer, 1959 — Tanzania
 Allocosa tarentulina (Audouin, 1826) — North Africa
 Allocosa tenebrosa (Thorell, 1897) — Myanmar
 Allocosa testacea Roewer, 1959 — South Africa
 Allocosa thieli (Dahl, 1908) — Bismarck Archipel
 Allocosa tremens (O. P.-Cambridge, 1876) — North Africa
 Allocosa tuberculipalpa (Caporiacco, 1940) — Central, East Africa
 Allocosa umtalica (Purcell, 1903) — East, Southern Africa
 Allocosa utahana Dondale & Redner, 1983 — USA
 Allocosa venezuelica (Caporiacco, 1955) — Venezuela
 Allocosa veracruzana (Gertsch & Davis, 1940) — Mexico
 Allocosa wittei Roewer, 1959 — Congo
 Allocosa woodwardi (Simon, 1909) — Western Australia
 Allocosa yurae (Strand, 1908) — Peru, Chile
 Allocosa zualella (Strand, 1907) — New South Wales

Allotrochosina
Allotrochosina Roewer, 1960
 Allotrochosina karri Vink, 2001 — Western Australia
 Allotrochosina schauinslandi (Simon, 1899) — New Zealand, Chatham Islands
 Allotrochosina walesiana Framenau, 2008 — New South Wales

Alopecosa
Alopecosa Simon, 1885
 Alopecosa accentuata (Latreille, 1817) — Palearctic
 Alopecosa aculeata (Clerck, 1757) — Holarctic
 Alopecosa akkolka Marusik, 1995 — Kazakhstan, China
 Alopecosa albofasciata (Brulle, 1832) — Mediterranean to Central Asia
 Alopecosa albofasciata rufa (Franganillo, 1918) — Spain
 Alopecosa albostriata (Grube, 1861) — Russia, Kazakhstan, China, Korea
 Alopecosa albovittata (Schmidt, 1895) — Russia
 Alopecosa alpicola (Simon, 1876) — Palearctic
 Alopecosa alpicola soriculata (Simon, 1876) — France, Italy
 Alopecosa alpicola vidua (Simon, 1937) — France
 Alopecosa andesiana (Berland, 1913) — Ecuador
 Alopecosa artenarensis Wunderlich, 1992 — Canary Islands
 Alopecosa atis Caporiacco, 1949 — North Africa
 Alopecosa atypica Ponomarev, 2008 — Kazakhstan
 Alopecosa auripilosa (Schenkel, 1953) — Russia, China, Korea
 Alopecosa aurita Chen, Song & Kim, 2001 — China
 Alopecosa azsheganovae Esyunin, 1996 — Russia
 Alopecosa balinensis (Giltay, 1935) — Bali
 Alopecosa barbipes (Sundevall, 1833) — Palearctic
 Alopecosa barbipes oreophila (Simon, 1937) — France
 Alopecosa beckeri (Thorell, 1875) — Ukraine
 Alopecosa camerunensis Roewer, 1960 — Cameroon
 Alopecosa canaricola Schmidt, 1982 — Canary Islands
 Alopecosa cedroensis Wunderlich, 1992 — Canary Islands
 Alopecosa chagyabensis Hu & Li, 1987 — China
 Alopecosa cinnameopilosa (Schenkel, 1963) — Russia, China, Korea, Japan
 Alopecosa cronebergi (Thorell, 1875) — Hungary, Russia, Ukraine
 Alopecosa cuneata (Clerck, 1757) — Palearctic
 Alopecosa cursor (Hahn, 1831) — Palearctic
 Alopecosa cursor cursorioides Charitonov, 1969 — Russia, Central Asia
 Alopecosa curtohirta Tang, Urita & Song, 1993 — China
 Alopecosa deserta Ponomarev, 2007 — Kazakhstan
 Alopecosa disca Tang et al., 1997 — China
 Alopecosa dryada Cordes, 1996 — Greece
 Alopecosa edax (Thorell, 1875) — Poland, China
 Alopecosa ermolaevi Savelyeva, 1972 — Kazakhstan
 Alopecosa etrusca Lugetti & Tongiorgi, 1969 — Italy, Turkey
 Alopecosa exasperans (O. P.-Cambridge, 1877) — Canada, Greenland
 Alopecosa fabrilis (Clerck, 1757) — Palearctic
 Alopecosa fabrilis trinacriae Lugetti & Tongiorgi, 1969 — Sicily
 Alopecosa farinosa (Herman, 1879) — Central Asia
 Alopecosa fedotovi (Charitonov, 1946) — Central Asia
 Alopecosa fuerteventurensis Wunderlich, 1992 — Canary Islands
 Alopecosa fulvastra Caporiacco, 1955 — Venezuela
 Alopecosa gomerae (Strand, 1911) — Canary Islands
 Alopecosa gracilis (Bösenberg, 1895) — Canary Islands
 Alopecosa grancanariensis Wunderlich, 1992 — Canary Islands
 Alopecosa hamata (Schenkel, 1963) — China
 Alopecosa hermiguensis Wunderlich, 1992 — Canary Islands
 Alopecosa himalayaensis Hu, 2001 — China
 Alopecosa hingganica Tang, Urita & Song, 1993 — Mongolia, China
 Alopecosa hirta (Kulczynski, 1908) — Russia
 Alopecosa hirtipes (Kulczynski, 1907) — Canada, Alaska, Russia
 Alopecosa hoevelsi Schmidt & Barensteiner, 2000 — China
 Alopecosa hokkaidensis Tanaka, 1985 — Russia, China, Japan
 Alopecosa huabanna Chen, Song & Gao, 2000 — China
 Alopecosa hui Chen, Song & Kim, 2001 — China
 Alopecosa inderensis Ponomarev, 2007 — Kazakhstan
 Alopecosa inimica (O. P.-Cambridge, 1885) — Tajikistan
 Alopecosa inquilina (Clerck, 1757) — Palearctic
 Alopecosa irinae Lobanova, 1978 — Russia
 Alopecosa kalahariana Roewer, 1960 — Botswana
 Alopecosa kalavrita Buchar, 2001 — Greece
 Alopecosa kaplanovi Oliger, 1983 — Russia
 Alopecosa kasakhstanica Savelyeva, 1972 — Russia, Kazakhstan
 Alopecosa kochi (Keyserling, 1877) — North America
 Alopecosa kovblyuki Nadolny & Ponomarev, 2012 — Russia, Ukraine
 Alopecosa kratochvili (Schenkel, 1963) — China
 Alopecosa kronebergi Andreeva, 1976 — Central Asia
 Alopecosa krynickii (Thorell, 1875) — Ukraine
 Alopecosa kulczynski Sternbergs, 1979 — Russia
 Alopecosa kulczynskii (Bösenberg, 1895) — Canary Islands
 Alopecosa kulsaryensis Ponomarev, 2012 — Kazakhstan
 Alopecosa kungurica Esyunin, 1996 — Russia
 Alopecosa kuntzi Denis, 1953 — Sicily, Yemen
 Alopecosa laciniosa (Simon, 1876) — France
 Alopecosa lallemandi (Berland, 1913) — Ecuador
 Alopecosa latifasciata (Kroneberg, 1875) — Central Asia
 Alopecosa leonhardii (Strand, 1913) — Central Australia
 Alopecosa lessertiana Brignoli, 1983 — China
 Alopecosa licenti (Schenkel, 1953) — Russia, Mongolia, China, Korea
 Alopecosa lindbergi Roewer, 1960 — Afghanistan
 Alopecosa linzhan Chen & Song, 2003 — China
 Alopecosa litvinovi Izmailova, 1989 — Russia
 Alopecosa longicymbia Savelyeva, 1972 — Kazakhstan
 Alopecosa madigani (Hickman, 1944) — Northern Territory
 Alopecosa mariae (Dahl, 1908) — Palearctic
 Alopecosa mariae orientalis (Kolosvary, 1934) — Hungary
 Alopecosa marikovskyi Logunov, 2013 — Kazakhstan
 Alopecosa medvedevi Ponomarev, 2009 — Kazakhstan
 Alopecosa mikhailovi Omelko, Marusik & Koponen, 2013 — Sakhalin Islands
 Alopecosa moesta (Holmberg, 1876) — Argentina
 Alopecosa mojonia (Mello-Leitao, 1941) — Argentina
 Alopecosa moriutii Tanaka, 1985 — Russia, Korea, Japan
 Alopecosa mutabilis (Kulczynski, 1908) — Russia, Alaska
 Alopecosa nagpag Chen, Song & Kim, 2001 — China
 Alopecosa nemurensis (Strand, 1907) — Japan
 Alopecosa nigricans (Simon, 1886) — Argentina, Falkland Islands
 Alopecosa nitidus Hu, 2001 — China
 Alopecosa notabilis (Schmidt, 1895) — Kazakhstan
 Alopecosa nybelini Roewer, 1960 — Afghanistan
 Alopecosa oahuensis (Keyserling, 1890) — Hawaii
 Alopecosa obscura Schmidt, 1980 — Canary Islands
 Alopecosa obsoleta (C. L. Koch, 1847) — Turkmenistan
 Alopecosa orbisaca Peng et al., 1997 — China
 Alopecosa orotavensis (Strand, 1916) — Canary Islands
 Alopecosa osa Marusik, Hippa & Koponen, 1996 — Russia
 Alopecosa osellai Lugetti & Tongiorgi, 1969 — Spain
 Alopecosa ovalis Chen, Song & Gao, 2000 — China
 Alopecosa palmae Schmidt, 1982 — Canary Islands
 Alopecosa pelusiaca (Audouin, 1826) — North Africa
 Alopecosa pentheri (Nosek, 1905) — Bulgaria, Greece to Azerbaijan
 Alopecosa pictilis (Emerton, 1885) — Holarctic
 Alopecosa pinetorum (Thorell, 1856) — Palearctic
 Alopecosa psammophila Buchar, 2001 — Czech Republic, Slovakia, Hungary, Russia
 Alopecosa pseudocuneata (Schenkel, 1953) — China
 Alopecosa pulverulenta (Clerck, 1757) — Palearctic
 Alopecosa pulverulenta tridentina (Thorell, 1875) — Austria
 Alopecosa raddei (Simon, 1889) — Central Asia
 Alopecosa rapa (Karsch, 1881) — Gilbert Islands
 Alopecosa reimoseri (Kolosvary, 1934) — Hungary
 Alopecosa restricta Mello-Leitao, 1940 — Argentina
 Alopecosa roeweri (Rosca, 1937) — Ukraine
 Alopecosa rosea Mello-Leitao, 1945 — Argentina
 Alopecosa saurica Marusik, 1995 — Kazakhstan
 Alopecosa schmidti (Hahn, 1835) — Palearctic
 Alopecosa sciophila Ponomarev, 2008 — Kazakhstan
 Alopecosa sibirica (Kulczynski, 1908) — Russia, Mongolia, China
 Alopecosa simoni (Thorell, 1872) — Mediterranean
 Alopecosa sokhondoensis Logunov & Marusik, 1995 — Russia
 Alopecosa solitaria (Herman, 1879) — Europe, Russia
 Alopecosa solivaga (Kulczynski, 1901) — Russia, Mongolia, China
 Alopecosa solivaga annulata (Kulczynski, 1916) — Russia
 Alopecosa solivaga borea (Kulczynski, 1908) — Russia
 Alopecosa solivaga katunjica (Ermolajev, 1937) — Russia
 Alopecosa solivaga lineata (Kulczynski, 1916) — Russia
 Alopecosa spasskyi Ponomarev, 2008 — Kazakhstan
 Alopecosa spinata Yu & Song, 1988 — China
 Alopecosa steppica Ponomarev, 2007 — Russia
 Alopecosa strandi (Rosca, 1936) — Romania, Ukraine
 Alopecosa striatipes (C. L. Koch, 1839) — Europe to Central Asia
 Alopecosa sublimbata Roewer, 1960 — Bioko
 Alopecosa subrufa (Schenkel, 1963) — Russia, Mongolia, China
 Alopecosa subsolitaria Savelyeva, 1972 — Kazakhstan
 Alopecosa subvalida Guy, 1966 — Morocco
 Alopecosa sulzeri (Pavesi, 1873) — Palearctic
 Alopecosa taeniata (C. L. Koch, 1835) — Palearctic
 Alopecosa taeniopus (Kulczynski, 1895) — Bulgaria to China
 Alopecosa tanakai Omelko & Marusik, 2008 — Russia
 Alopecosa thaleri Hepner & Paulus, 2007 — Canary Islands
 Alopecosa trabalis (Clerck, 1757) — Europe to Central Asia
 Alopecosa trabalis albica (Franganillo, 1913) — Spain
 Alopecosa tunetana Roewer, 1960 — Tunisia
 Alopecosa uiensis Esyunin, 1996 — Russia
 Alopecosa upembania Roewer, 1960 — Congo
 Alopecosa valida (Lucas, 1846) — Morocco, Algeria
 Alopecosa virgata (Kishida, 1909) — Russia, Korea, Japan
 Alopecosa volubilis Yoo, Kim & Tanaka, 2004 — Russia, Korea, Japan
 Alopecosa wenxianensis Tang et al., 1997 — China
 Alopecosa xilinensis Peng et al., 1997 — China
 Alopecosa xiningensis Hu, 2001 — China
 Alopecosa xinjiangensis Hu & Wu, 1989 — Mongolia, China
 Alopecosa yamalensis Esyunin, 1996 — Russia
 Alopecosa zyuzini Logunov & Marusik, 1995 — Russia, Mongolia

Amblyothele
Amblyothele Simon, 1910
 Amblyothele albocincta Simon, 1910 — Botswana
 Amblyothele atlantica Russell-Smith, Jocque & Alderweireldt, 2009 — Cameroon
 Amblyothele ecologica Russell-Smith, Jocque & Alderweireldt, 2009 — South Africa
 Amblyothele hamatula Russell-Smith, Jocque & Alderweireldt, 2009 — Ivory Coast
 Amblyothele kivumba Russell-Smith, Jocque & Alderweireldt, 2009 — Rwanda
 Amblyothele latedissipata Russell-Smith, Jocque & Alderweireldt, 2009 — Tanzania, Mozambique, South Africa
 Amblyothele longipes Russell-Smith, Jocque & Alderweireldt, 2009 — Ivory Coast, Togo
 Amblyothele togona Roewer, 1960 — Ivory Coast, Cameroon, Togo, Congo, Kenya

Anomalomma
Anomalomma Simon, 1890
 Anomalomma harishi Dyal, 1935 — Pakistan
 Anomalomma lycosinum Simon, 1890 — Java
 Anomalomma rhodesianum Roewer, 1960 — Zimbabwe

Anomalosa
Anomalosa Roewer, 1960
 Anomalosa kochi (Simon, 1898) — Queensland
 Anomalosa oz Framenau, 2006 — South Australia, New South Wales, Victoria

Anoteropsis
Anoteropsis L. Koch, 1878
 Anoteropsis adumbrata (Urquhart, 1887) — New Zealand, Stewart Islands
 Anoteropsis aerescens (Goyen, 1887) — New Zealand
 Anoteropsis alpina Vink, 2002 — New Zealand
 Anoteropsis arenivaga (Dalmas, 1917) — New Zealand
 Anoteropsis blesti Vink, 2002 — New Zealand
 Anoteropsis canescens (Goyen, 1887) — New Zealand
 Anoteropsis cantuaria Vink, 2002 — New Zealand
 Anoteropsis flavescens L. Koch, 1878 — New Zealand
 Anoteropsis flavovittata Simon, 1880 — New Caledonia
 Anoteropsis forsteri Vink, 2002 — New Zealand, Stewart Islands
 Anoteropsis hallae Vink, 2002 — New Zealand
 Anoteropsis hilaris (L. Koch, 1877) — New Zealand, Stewart Islands, Auckland Islands
 Anoteropsis insularis Vink, 2002 — Chatham Islands, Pitt Islands
 Anoteropsis lacustris Vink, 2002 — New Zealand
 Anoteropsis litoralis Vink, 2002 — New Zealand
 Anoteropsis montana Vink, 2002 — New Zealand
 Anoteropsis okatainae Vink, 2002 — New Zealand
 Anoteropsis papuana Thorell, 1881 — New Guinea
 Anoteropsis ralphi (Simon, 1905) — Chatham Islands
 Anoteropsis senica (L. Koch, 1877) — New Zealand, Stewart Islands
 Anoteropsis urquharti (Simon, 1898) — New Zealand
 Anoteropsis virgata (Karsch, 1880) — Polynesia
 Anoteropsis westlandica Vink, 2002 — New Zealand

Arctosa
Arctosa C. L. Koch, 1847
 Arctosa albida (Simon, 1898) — South Africa
 Arctosa albopellita (L. Koch, 1875) — Ethiopia
 Arctosa algerina Roewer, 1960 — Algeria
 Arctosa aliusmodi (Karsch, 1880) — Polynesia
 Arctosa alluaudi Guy, 1966 — Morocco
 Arctosa alpigena (Doleschall, 1852) — Holarctic
 Arctosa alpigena lamperti Dahl, 1908 — Central, Eastern Europe
 Arctosa amylaceoides (Schenkel, 1936) — China
 Arctosa andina (Chamberlin, 1916) — Peru
 Arctosa astuta (GerstÃ€cker, 1873) — Central Africa
 Arctosa atriannulipes (Strand, 1906) — Ethiopia
 Arctosa atroventrosa (Lenz, 1886) — Madagascar
 Arctosa aussereri (Keyserling, 1877) — Puerto Rico, Colombia
 Arctosa bacchabunda (Karsch, 1884) — Sao Tome
 Arctosa bakva (Roewer, 1960) — Afghanistan
 Arctosa berlandi (Caporiacco, 1949) — East Africa
 Arctosa bicoloripes (Roewer, 1960) — Rwanda
 Arctosa biseriata Roewer, 1960 — Congo
 Arctosa bogotensis (Keyserling, 1877) — Colombia
 Arctosa brauni (Strand, 1916) — East Africa
 Arctosa brevialva (Franganillo, 1913) — Spain
 Arctosa brevispina (Lessert, 1915) — Central, East Africa
 Arctosa camerunensis Roewer, 1960 — Cameroon
 Arctosa capensis Roewer, 1960 — South Africa
 Arctosa chungjooensis Paik, 1994 — Korea
 Arctosa cinerea (Fabricius, 1777) — Palearctic, Congo
 Arctosa cinerea obscura (Franganillo, 1913) — Spain
 Arctosa coreana Paik, 1994 — Korea
 Arctosa daisetsuzana (Saito, 1934) — Japan
 Arctosa darountaha Roewer, 1960 — Afghanistan
 Arctosa denticulata Jimenez & Dondale, 1984 — Mexico
 Arctosa depectinata (Bösenberg & Strand, 1906) — China, Japan
 Arctosa depuncta (O. P.-Cambridge, 1876) — Libya, Egypt
 Arctosa deserta (O. P.-Cambridge, 1872) — Syria
 Arctosa dissonans (O. P.-Cambridge, 1872) — Syria, Lebanon, Israel
 Arctosa ebicha Yaginuma, 1960 — China, Korea, Japan
 Arctosa edeana Roewer, 1960 — Cameroon
 Arctosa emertoni Gertsch, 1934 — USA, Canada
 Arctosa ephippiata Roewer, 1960 — Cameroon
 Arctosa epiana (Berland, 1938) — New Hebrides
 Arctosa erythraeana Roewer, 1960 — Ethiopia
 Arctosa excellens (Simon, 1876) — Portugal, Spain
 Arctosa fessana Roewer, 1960 — Libya
 Arctosa figurata (Simon, 1876) — Europe, Russia
 Arctosa frequentissima Caporiacco, 1947 — Central, East Africa
 Arctosa fujiii Tanaka, 1985 — China, Japan
 Arctosa fulvolineata (Lucas, 1846) — Europe, Mallorca, North Africa
 Arctosa fusca (Keyserling, 1877) — Central America, West Indies
 Arctosa gougu Chen & Song, 1999 — China
 Arctosa hallasanensis Paik, 1994 — Korea
 Arctosa harraria Roewer, 1960 — Ethiopia
 Arctosa hikosanensis Tanaka, 1985 — Japan
 Arctosa himalayensis Tikader & Malhotra, 1980 — India
 Arctosa hottentotta Roewer, 1960 — Namibia
 Arctosa humicola (Bertkau, 1880) — Brazil, Guyana
 Arctosa hunanensis Yin, Peng & Bao, 1997 — China
 Arctosa inconspicua (Bryant, 1948) — Hispaniola
 Arctosa indica Tikader & Malhotra, 1980 — India, China
 Arctosa insignita (Thorell, 1872) — USA, Canada, Alaska, Greenland, Russia
 Arctosa intricaria (C. L. Koch, 1847) — Mediterranean
 Arctosa ipsa (Karsch, 1879) — Russia, Korea, Japan
 Arctosa janetscheki Buchar, 1976 — Nepal
 Arctosa kadjahkaia Roewer, 1960 — Afghanistan
 Arctosa kansuensis (Schenkel, 1936) — China
 Arctosa kassenjea (Strand, 1913) — Central, East Africa
 Arctosa kawabe Tanaka, 1985 — Russia, Korea, Japan
 Arctosa kazibana Roewer, 1960 — Congo
 Arctosa keniana (Roewer, 1960) — Congo
 Arctosa keumjeungsana Paik, 1994 — Russia, Korea
 Arctosa khudiensis (Sinha, 1951) — India, China
 Arctosa kiangsiensis (Schenkel, 1963) — China
 Arctosa kirkiana (Strand, 1913) — Central, East Africa
 Arctosa kiwuana (Strand, 1913) — Central, East Africa
 Arctosa kolosvaryi (Caporiacco, 1947) — Ethiopia
 Arctosa kwangreungensis Paik & Tanaka, 1986 — China, Korea
 Arctosa labiata Tso & Chen, 2004 — Taiwan
 Arctosa laccophila (Simon, 1910) — Guinea-Bissau
 Arctosa lacupemba (Roewer, 1960) — Congo
 Arctosa lacustris (Simon, 1876) — Canary Islands, Mallorca, Mediterranean
 Arctosa lagodechiensis Mcheidze, 1997 — Georgia
 Arctosa lama Dondale & Redner, 1983 — USA, Canada
 Arctosa laminata Yu & Song, 1988 — China, Japan
 Arctosa lawrencei (Roewer, 1960) — South Africa
 Arctosa leaeniformis (Simon, 1910) — Botswana
 Arctosa leopardus (Sundevall, 1833) — Palearctic
 Arctosa lesserti Reimoser, 1934 — India
 Arctosa letourneuxi (Simon, 1885) — Morocco to Tunisia
 Arctosa lightfooti (Purcell, 1903) — South Africa
 Arctosa litigiosa Roewer, 1960 — Congo, Tanzania
 Arctosa littoralis (Hentz, 1844) — North, Central America
 Arctosa liujiapingensis Yin et al., 1997 — China
 Arctosa lutetiana (Simon, 1876) — Europe, Russia
 Arctosa maculata (Hahn, 1822) — Europe, Russia, Turkey
 Arctosa maderana Roewer, 1960 — Madeira
 Arctosa marfieldi Roewer, 1960 — Cameroon
 Arctosa marocensis Roewer, 1960 — Morocco
 Arctosa meinerti (Thorell, 1875) — Algeria
 Arctosa meitanensis Yin et al., 1993 — China
 Arctosa minuta F. O. P.-Cambridge, 1902 — USA to Guyana
 Arctosa mittensa Yin et al., 1993 — China
 Arctosa mossambica Roewer, 1960 — Mozambique
 Arctosa mulani (Dyal, 1935) — India, Pakistan
 Arctosa nava Roewer, 1955 — Iran
 Arctosa niccensis (Strand, 1907) — Japan
 Arctosa ningboensis Yin, Bao & Zhang, 1996 — China
 Arctosa nivosa (Purcell, 1903) — South Africa
 Arctosa nonsignata Roewer, 1960 — Congo
 Arctosa nyembeensis (Strand, 1916) — East Africa
 Arctosa obscura Denis, 1953 — Yemen
 Arctosa oneili (Purcell, 1903) — South Africa
 Arctosa otaviensis Roewer, 1960 — Namibia
 Arctosa pardosina (Simon, 1898) — Uzbekistan
 Arctosa pargongensis Paik, 1994 — Korea
 Arctosa pelengea Roewer, 1960 — Congo
 Arctosa perita (Latreille, 1799) — Holarctic
 Arctosa perita arenicola (Simon, 1937) — France
 Arctosa personata (L. Koch, 1872) — Western Mediterranean
 Arctosa pichoni Schenkel, 1963 — China
 Arctosa picturella (Strand, 1906) — Ethiopia
 Arctosa poecila Caporiacco, 1939 — Ethiopia
 Arctosa politana Roewer, 1960 — Ethiopia
 Arctosa promontorii (Pocock, 1900) — South Africa
 Arctosa pseudoleopardus Ponomarev, 2007 — Russia
 Arctosa pugil (Bertkau, 1880) — Brazil
 Arctosa pungcheunensis Paik, 1994 — Korea
 Arctosa quadripunctata (Lucas, 1846) — North Africa
 Arctosa raptor (Kulczynski, 1885) — Russia, Nepal, USA, Canada
 Arctosa ravida Ponomarev, 2007 — Kazakhstan
 Arctosa recurva Yu & Song, 1988 — China
 Arctosa renidescens Buchar & Thaler, 1995 — Central Europe
 Arctosa ripaecola (Roewer, 1960) — Tanzania
 Arctosa rubicunda (Keyserling, 1877) — USA, Canada
 Arctosa rufescens Roewer, 1960 — Cameroon
 Arctosa sanctaerosae Gertsch & Wallace, 1935 — USA
 Arctosa sandeshkhaliensis Majumder, 2004 — India
 Arctosa sapiranga Silva & Lise, 2009 — Brazil
 Arctosa schensiensis Schenkel, 1963 — China
 Arctosa schweinfurthi (Strand, 1906) — Ethiopia
 Arctosa scopulitibiis (Strand, 1906) — Ethiopia
 Arctosa serii Roth & Brown, 1976 — Mexico
 Arctosa serrulata Mao & Song, 1985 — China
 Arctosa similis Schenkel, 1938 — Canary Islands, Morocco, Portugal to Croatia
 Arctosa simoni Guy, 1966 — Turkey
 Arctosa sjostedti Roewer, 1960 — Tanzania
 Arctosa sordulenta (Thorell, 1899) — Cameroon
 Arctosa springiosa Yin et al., 1993 — China
 Arctosa stigmosa (Thorell, 1875) — France, Norway to Ukraine
 Arctosa subamylacea (Bösenberg & Strand, 1906) — Kazakhstan, China, Korea, Japan
 Arctosa swatowensis (Strand, 1907) — China
 Arctosa tanakai Barrion & Litsinger, 1995 — Philippines
 Arctosa tappaensis Gajbe, 2004 — India
 Arctosa tbilisiensis Mcheidze, 1946 — Bulgaria, Greece to Georgia
 Arctosa tenuissima (Purcell, 1903) — South Africa
 Arctosa testacea Roewer, 1960 — Tanzania
 Arctosa togona Roewer, 1960 — Togo
 Arctosa transvaalana Roewer, 1960 — South Africa
 Arctosa tridens (Simon, 1937) — Algeria
 Arctosa tridentata Chen & Song, 1999 — China
 Arctosa truncata Tso & Chen, 2004 — Taiwan
 Arctosa upembana Roewer, 1960 — Congo
 Arctosa vaginalis Yu & Song, 1988 — China
 Arctosa variana C. L. Koch, 1847 — Mediterranean to Central Asia
 Arctosa villica (Lucas, 1846) — Western Mediterranean
 Arctosa virgo (Chamberlin, 1925) — USA
 Arctosa wittei Roewer, 1960 — Congo, Tanzania
 Arctosa workmani (Strand, 1909) — Paraguay
 Arctosa xunyangensis Wang & Qiu, 1992 — China
 Arctosa yasudai (Tanaka, 2000) — Japan
 Arctosa ziyunensis Yin, Peng & Bao, 1997 — China

Arctosippa
Arctosippa Roewer, 1960
 Arctosippa gracilis (Keyserling, 1881) — Peru

Arctosomma
Arctosomma Roewer, 1960
 Arctosomma trochosiforme (Strand, 1906) — Ethiopia

Artoria
Artoria Thorell, 1877
 Artoria albopedipalpis Framenau, 2002 — Victoria
 Artoria albopilata (Urquhart, 1893) — Queensland to South Australia, Tasmania
 Artoria alta Framenau, 2004 — New South Wales
 Artoria amoena (Roewer, 1960) — Congo
 Artoria avona Framenau, 2002 — South Australia, Victoria
 Artoria berenice (L. Koch, 1877) — Queensland to Tasmania, New Caledonia, Vanuatu
 Artoria cingulipes Simon, 1909 — Western Australia, South Australia
 Artoria flavimana Simon, 1909 — Western Australia to New South Wales
 Artoria gloriosa (Rainbow, 1920) — Lord Howe Islands
 Artoria hebridisiana (Berland, 1938) — New Hebrides
 Artoria hospita Vink, 2002 — New Zealand
 Artoria howquaensis Framenau, 2002 — South Australia, Victoria
 Artoria impedita (Simon, 1909) — Western Australia
 Artoria ligulacea (Qu, Peng & Yin, 2009) — China
 Artoria lineata (L. Koch, 1877) — South Australia, New South Wales to Tasmania
 Artoria linnaei Framenau, 2008 — Western Australia
 Artoria lycosimorpha Strand, 1909 — South Africa
 Artoria maculatipes (Roewer, 1960) — Namibia
 Artoria mckayi Framenau, 2002 — Queensland to Tasmania
 Artoria minima (Berland, 1938) — New Hebrides
 Artoria palustris Dahl, 1908 — New Guinea, Bismarck Archipel
 Artoria parvula Thorell, 1877 — China, Philippines, Sulawesi, Northern Territory
 Artoria pruinosa (L. Koch, 1877) — New South Wales
 Artoria quadrata Framenau, 2002 — Queensland, New South Wales, Victoria
 Artoria schizocoides Framenau & Hebets, 2007 — Western Australia
 Artoria segrega Vink, 2002 — New Zealand
 Artoria separata Vink, 2002 — New Zealand
 Artoria taeniifera Simon, 1909 — Western Australia, New South Wales
 Artoria thorelli (Berland, 1929) — Samoa, Marquesas Islands
 Artoria triangularis Framenau, 2002 — South Australia, Queensland to Tasmania
 Artoria ulrichi Framenau, 2002 — New South Wales, Victoria
 Artoria victoriensis Framenau, Gotch & Austin, 2006 — South Australia, New South Wales, Victoria

Artoriellula
Artoriellula Roewer, 1960
 Artoriellula bicolor (Simon, 1898) — South Africa
 Artoriellula celebensis (Merian, 1911) — Sulawesi

Artoriopsis
Artoriopsis Framenau, 2007
 Artoriopsis anacardium Framenau, 2007 — Northern Territory, Queensland
 Artoriopsis eccentrica Framenau, 2007 — Western Australia, South Australia, Victoria
 Artoriopsis expolita (L. Koch, 1877) — Australia, Tasmania
 Artoriopsis joergi Framenau, 2007 — Western Australia, South Australia
 Artoriopsis klausi Framenau, 2007 — South Australia, New South Wales, Victoria
 Artoriopsis melissae Framenau, 2007 — Queensland to Tasmania
 Artoriopsis whitehouseae Framenau, 2007 — Queensland, New South Wales

Aulonia
Aulonia C. L. Koch, 1847
 Aulonia albimana (Walckenaer, 1805) — Palearctic
 Aulonia kratochvili Dunin, Buchar & Absolon, 1986 — Greece to Central Asia

Auloniella
Auloniella Roewer, 1960
 Auloniella maculisterna Roewer, 1960 — Tanzania

Birabenia
Birabenia Mello-Leitao, 1941
 Birabenia birabenae Mello-Leitao, 1941 — Argentina
 Birabenia vittata (Mello-Leitao, 1945) — Argentina, Uruguay

Bogdocosa
Bogdocosa Ponomarev & Belosludtsev, 2008
 Bogdocosa kronebergi (Andreeva, 1976) — Russia, Central Asia, Iran, China

Brevilabus
Brevilabus Strand, 1908
 Brevilabus gillonorum Cornic, 1980 — Ivory Coast
 Brevilabus oryx (Simon, 1886) — Senegal, Ethiopia

Bristowiella
Bristowiella Saaristo, 1980
 Bristowiella kartalensis Alderweireldt, 1988 — Comoro Islands
 Bristowiella seychellensis (Bristowe, 1973) — Seychelles, Aldabra, Comoro Islands

Camptocosa
Camptocosa Dondale, Jimenez & Nieto, 2005
 Camptocosa parallela

Caporiaccosa
Caporiaccosa Roewer, 1960
 Caporiaccosa arctosaeformis (Caporiacco, 1940) — Ethiopia

Caspicosa
Caspicosa Ponomarev, 2007
 Caspicosa kulsaryensis Ponomarev, 2007 — Kazakhstan
 Caspicosa manytchensis Ponomarev, 2007 — Russia

Costacosa
Costacosa Framenau & Leung, 2013
 Costacosa dondalei Framenau & Leung, 2013 — Western Australia
 Costacosa torbjorni Framenau & Leung, 2013 — Western Australia

Crocodilosa
Crocodilosa Caporiacco, 1947
 Crocodilosa kittenbergeri Caporiacco, 1947 — East Africa
 Crocodilosa leucostigma (Simon, 1885) — India
 Crocodilosa maindroni (Simon, 1897) — India
 Crocodilosa ovicula (Thorell, 1895) — Myanmar
 Crocodilosa virulenta (O. P.-Cambridge, 1876) — Egypt

Cynosa
Cynosa Caporiacco, 1933
 Cynosa agedabiae Caporiacco, 1933 — North Africa

Dejerosa
Dejerosa Roewer, 1960
 Dejerosa picta Roewer, 1960 — Mozambique

Deliriosa
Deliriosa Kovblyuk, 2009
 Deliriosa karadagensis Kovblyuk, 2009 — Ukraine

Diahogna
Diahogna Roewer, 1960
 Diahogna exculta (L. Koch, 1876) — New South Wales, New Caledonia
 Diahogna hildegardae Framenau, 2006 — New South Wales, Victoria
 Diahogna martensi (Karsch, 1878) — New South Wales, Victoria, South Australia, Tasmania
 Diahogna pisauroides Framenau, 2006 — Northern Territory

Diapontia
Diapontia Keyserling, 1876
 Diapontia niveovittata Mello-Leitao, 1945 — Argentina
 Diapontia pourtaleensis Mello-Leitao, 1944 — Argentina
 Diapontia senescens Mello-Leitao, 1944 — Argentina
 Diapontia uruguayensis Keyserling, 1877 — Brazil, Peru, Uruguay, Argentina

Dingosa
Dingosa Roewer, 1955
 Dingosa humphreysi (McKay, 1985) — Southern Australia
 Dingosa liopus (Chamberlin, 1916) — Peru
 Dingosa murata Framenau & Baehr, 2007 — Southern Australia
 Dingosa serrata (L. Koch, 1877) — Southern Australia
 Dingosa simsoni (Simon, 1898) — Southern Australia, Tasmania
 Dingosa venefica (Keyserling, 1891) — Brazil

Dolocosa
Dolocosa Roewer, 1960
 Dolocosa dolosa (O. P.-Cambridge, 1873) — St. Helena

Donacosa
Donacosa Alderweireldt & Jocque, 1991
 Donacosa merlini Alderweireldt & Jocque, 1991 — Spain

Dorjulopirata
Dorjulopirata Buchar, 1997
 Dorjulopirata dorjulanus Buchar, 1997 — Bhutan

Draposa
Draposa Kronestedt, 2010
 Draposa amkhasensis (Tikader & Malhotra, 1976) — India
 Draposa atropalpis (Gravely, 1924) — India, Sri Lanka
 Draposa burasantiensis (Tikader & Malhotra, 1976) — India, China
 Draposa lyrivulva (Bösenberg & Strand, 1906) — Pakistan, India, Sri Lanka
 Draposa nicobarica (Thorell, 1891) — Nicobar Islands
 Draposa oakleyi Gravely, 1924 — Pakistan, India, Bangladesh
 Draposa porpaensis (Gajbe, 2004) — India
 Draposa subhadrae (Patel & Reddy, 1993) — India, Sri Lanka
 Draposa tenasserimensis (Thorell, 1895) — Myanmar, possibly Sumatra, Java
 Draposa zhanjiangensis (Yin et al., 1995) — China, possibly Malaysia, Sumatra, Borneo

Edenticosa
Edenticosa Roewer, 1960
 Edenticosa edentula (Simon, 1910) — Bioko

Evippa
Evippa Simon, 1882
 Evippa aculeata (Kroneberg, 1875) — Central Asia
 Evippa aequalis Alderweireldt, 1991 — Senegal, Sudan
 Evippa apsheronica Marusik, Guseinov & Koponen, 2003 — Russia, Azerbaijan
 Evippa arenaria (Audouin, 1826) — North Africa
 Evippa badchysica Sternbergs, 1979 — Turkmenistan
 Evippa banarensis Tikader & Malhotra, 1980 — India
 Evippa benevola (O. P.-Cambridge, 1885) — Yarkand
 Evippa beschkentica Andreeva, 1976 — Central Asia
 Evippa caucasica Marusik, Guseinov & Koponen, 2003 — Azerbaijan
 Evippa concolor (Kroneberg, 1875) — Tajikistan
 Evippa douglasi Hogg, 1912 — China
 Evippa eltonica Dunin, 1994 — Russia, Kazakhstan
 Evippa fortis Roewer, 1955 — Iran
 Evippa jabalpurensis Gajbe, 2004 — India
 Evippa jocquei Alderweireldt, 1991 — North Africa
 Evippa kazachstanica Ponomarev, 2007 — Kazakhstan
 Evippa kirchshoferae Roewer, 1959 — Tunisia
 Evippa lugubris Chen, Song & Kim, 1998 — China
 Evippa luteipalpis Roewer, 1955 — Iran
 Evippa mandlaensis Gajbe, 2004 — India
 Evippa massaica (Roewer, 1959) — Tanzania
 Evippa nigerrima (Miller & Buchar, 1972) — Afghanistan
 Evippa onager Simon, 1895 — China, Turkmenistan
 Evippa praelongipes (O. P.-Cambridge, 1870) — Egypt to India, Pakistan, Kazakhstan
 Evippa projecta Alderweireldt, 1991 — Kenya
 Evippa rajasthanea Tikader & Malhotra, 1980 — India
 Evippa rubiginosa Simon, 1885 — India
 Evippa russellsmithi Alderweireldt, 1991 — Ethiopia, Somalia
 Evippa schenkeli Sternbergs, 1979 — Turkmenistan
 Evippa shivajii Tikader & Malhotra, 1980 — India
 Evippa sibirica Marusik, 1995 — Russia, Mongolia, Kazakhstan, China
 Evippa sjostedti Schenkel, 1936 — Central Asia, Mongolia, China
 Evippa soderbomi Schenkel, 1936 — Mongolia, China
 Evippa sohani Tikader & Malhotra, 1980 — India
 Evippa solanensis Tikader & Malhotra, 1980 — India
 Evippa strandi (Lessert, 1926) — Congo, Rwanda, Tanzania
 Evippa turkmenica Sternbergs, 1979 — Turkmenistan

Evippomma
Evippomma Roewer, 1959
 Evippomma albomarginatum Alderweireldt, 1992 — Senegal to Ethiopia
 Evippomma evippiforme (Caporiacco, 1935) — Karakorum
 Evippomma evippinum (Simon, 1897) — India
 Evippomma plumipes (Lessert, 1936) — East, Southern Africa
 Evippomma simoni Alderweireldt, 1992 — Sudan, Egypt
 Evippomma squamulatum (Simon, 1898) — Southern Africa

Foveosa
Foveosa Russell-Smith, Alderweireldt & Jocque, 2007
 Foveosa adunca Russell-Smith, Alderweireldt & Jocque, 2007 — South Africa
 Foveosa albicapillis Russell-Smith, Alderweireldt & Jocque, 2007 — West Africa
 Foveosa foveolata (Purcell, 1903) — Central, East, Southern Africa
 Foveosa infuscata Russell-Smith, Alderweireldt & Jocque, 2007 — Nigeria, Ghana, Ivory Coast
 Foveosa tintinabulum Russell-Smith, Alderweireldt & Jocque, 2007 — Congo, Kenya

Geolycosa
Geolycosa Montgomery, 1904
 Geolycosa aballicola (Strand, 1906) — Ethiopia
 Geolycosa albimarginata (Badcock, 1932) — Paraguay
 Geolycosa appetens Roewer, 1960 — Namibia
 Geolycosa ashantica (Strand, 1916) — Ghana
 Geolycosa atroscopulata Roewer, 1955 — Iran
 Geolycosa atrosellata Roewer, 1960 — Congo
 Geolycosa bridarollii (Mello-Leitao, 1945) — Argentina
 Geolycosa buyebalana Roewer, 1960 — Congo
 Geolycosa carli (Reimoser, 1934) — India
 Geolycosa charitonovi (Mcheidze, 1997) — Russia, Abkhazia, Georgia, Azerbaijan
 Geolycosa conspersa (Thorell, 1877) — Myanmar, Borneo, Sulawesi
 Geolycosa cyrenaica (Simon, 1908) — North Africa
 Geolycosa diffusa Roewer, 1960 — Cameroon
 Geolycosa disposita Roewer, 1960 — Angola
 Geolycosa diversa Roewer, 1960 — Rwanda
 Geolycosa domifex (Hancock, 1899) — USA, Canada
 Geolycosa dunini Zyuzin & Logunov, 2000 — Georgia, Armenia, Azerbaijan
 Geolycosa egena (L. Koch, 1877) — Queensland
 Geolycosa escambiensis Wallace, 1942 — USA
 Geolycosa excussa (Tullgren, 1905) — Bolivia, Argentina
 Geolycosa fatifera (Hentz, 1842) — USA
 Geolycosa festina (L. Koch, 1877) — Queensland
 Geolycosa flavichelis Roewer, 1955 — Iran
 Geolycosa forsaythi (Dahl, 1908) — Bismarck Archipel
 Geolycosa gaerdesi Roewer, 1960 — Namibia
 Geolycosa gofensis (Strand, 1906) — Central Africa
 Geolycosa gosoga (Chamberlin, 1925) — USA
 Geolycosa habilis Roewer, 1960 — Congo, East Africa
 Geolycosa hectoria (Pocock, 1900) — South Africa
 Geolycosa hubbelli Wallace, 1942 — USA
 Geolycosa hyltonscottae (Mello-Leitao, 1941) — Argentina
 Geolycosa iaffa (Strand, 1913) — Israel
 Geolycosa impudica (Mello-Leitao, 1944) — Argentina
 Geolycosa incertula (Mello-Leitao, 1941) — Argentina
 Geolycosa infensa (L. Koch, 1877) — Queensland, New South Wales
 Geolycosa insulata (Mello-Leitao, 1944) — Argentina
 Geolycosa ituricola (Strand, 1913) — Central Africa
 Geolycosa katekeana Roewer, 1960 — Congo
 Geolycosa kijabica (Strand, 1916) — East Africa
 Geolycosa lancearia (Mello-Leitao, 1940) — Argentina
 Geolycosa latifrons Montgomery, 1904 — USA
 Geolycosa liberiana Roewer, 1960 — Liberia
 Geolycosa lindneri (Karsch, 1879) — West, Central Africa
 Geolycosa lusingana (Roewer, 1959) — Congo
 Geolycosa micanopy Wallace, 1942 — USA
 Geolycosa minor (Simon, 1910) — Bioko
 Geolycosa missouriensis (Banks, 1895) — USA, Canada
 Geolycosa natalensis Roewer, 1960 — South Africa
 Geolycosa nolotthensis (Simon, 1910) — Namibia, South Africa
 Geolycosa nossibeensis (Strand, 1907) — Madagascar
 Geolycosa ornatipes (Bryant, 1935) — USA
 Geolycosa patellonigra Wallace, 1942 — USA
 Geolycosa pikei (Marx, 1881) — USA
 Geolycosa rafaelana (Chamberlin, 1928) — USA
 Geolycosa raptatorides (Strand, 1909) — Uruguay
 Geolycosa riograndae Wallace, 1942 — USA
 Geolycosa rogersi Wallace, 1942 — USA
 Geolycosa rubrotaeniata (Keyserling, 1877) — Colombia
 Geolycosa rufibarbis (Mello-Leitao, 1947) — Brazil
 Geolycosa sangilia (Roewer, 1955) — Colombia
 Geolycosa schulzi (Dahl, 1908) — Bismarck Archipel
 Geolycosa sexmaculata Roewer, 1960 — Afghanistan
 Geolycosa shinkuluna Roewer, 1960 — Congo
 Geolycosa suahela (Strand, 1913) — Central, East Africa
 Geolycosa subvittata (Pocock, 1900) — South Africa
 Geolycosa tangana (Roewer, 1959) — Tanzania
 Geolycosa ternetzi (Mello-Leitao, 1939) — Paraguay
 Geolycosa timorensis (Thorell, 1881) — Timor
 Geolycosa togonia Roewer, 1960 — Togo
 Geolycosa turricola (Treat, 1880) — USA
 Geolycosa uinticolens (Chamberlin, 1936) — USA
 Geolycosa urbana (O. P.-Cambridge, 1876) — North, Central Africa to India
 Geolycosa urbana hova (Strand, 1907) — Madagascar
 Geolycosa uruguayaca (Strand, 1909) — Uruguay
 Geolycosa vultuosa (C. L. Koch, 1838) — Southeastern Europe to Central Asia
 Geolycosa wrighti (Emerton, 1912) — USA, Canada
 Geolycosa xera McCrone, 1963 — USA
 Geolycosa xera archboldi McCrone, 1963 — USA

Gladicosa
Gladicosa Brady, 1987
 Gladicosa bellamyi (Gertsch & Wallace, 1937) — USA
 Gladicosa euepigynata (Montgomery, 1904) — USA
 Gladicosa gulosa (Walckenaer, 1837) — USA, Canada
 Gladicosa huberti (Chamberlin, 1924) — USA
 Gladicosa pulchra (Keyserling, 1877) — USA

Gnatholycosa
Gnatholycosa Mello-Leitao, 1940
 Gnatholycosa spinipalpis Mello-Leitao, 1940 — Argentina

Hesperocosa
Hesperocosa Gertsch & Wallace, 1937
 Hesperocosa unica (Gertsch & Wallace, 1935) — USA

Hippasa
Hippasa Simon, 1885
 Hippasa affinis Lessert, 1933 — Angola
 Hippasa afghana Roewer, 1960 — Afghanistan
 Hippasa agelenoides (Simon, 1884) — India to Taiwan
 Hippasa albopunctata Thorell, 1899 — Cameroon, Ivory Coast
 Hippasa australis Lawrence, 1927 — Southern Africa
 Hippasa babai Tanikawa, 2007 — Japan
 Hippasa bifasciata Buchar, 1997 — Bhutan
 Hippasa brechti Alderweireldt & Jocque, 2005 — Ivory Coast, Togo
 Hippasa charamaensis Gajbe, 2004 — India
 Hippasa cinerea Simon, 1898 — Africa
 Hippasa decemnotata Simon, 1910 — West Africa
 Hippasa elienae Alderweireldt & Jocque, 2005 — Tanzania
 Hippasa fabreae Gajbe & Gajbe, 1999 — India
 Hippasa flavicoma Caporiacco, 1935 — Karakorum
 Hippasa funerea Lessert, 1925 — Southern Africa
 Hippasa greenalliae (Blackwall, 1867) — India, Bangladesh, Sri Lanka, China
 Hippasa hansae Gajbe & Gajbe, 1999 — India
 Hippasa haryanensis Arora & Monga, 1994 — India
 Hippasa himalayensis Gravely, 1924 — India
 Hippasa holmerae Thorell, 1895 — India to Philippines
 Hippasa holmerae sundaica Thorell, 1895 — Singapore
 Hippasa innesi Simon, 1889 — Egypt
 Hippasa lamtoensis Dresco, 1981 — Ivory Coast
 Hippasa loeffleri (Roewer, 1955) — Iran
 Hippasa loundesi Gravely, 1924 — India
 Hippasa lycosina Pocock, 1900 — India, China, Laos
 Hippasa madhuae Tikader & Malhotra, 1980 — India
 Hippasa madraspatana Gravely, 1924 — India
 Hippasa marginata Roewer, 1960 — Cameroon
 Hippasa olivacea (Thorell, 1887) — Myanmar, India
 Hippasa partita (O. P.-Cambridge, 1876) — Egypt to India, Central Asia
 Hippasa pisaurina Pocock, 1900 — Iraq, India, Pakistan, Bangladesh
 Hippasa simoni (Thorell, 1887) — Myanmar
 Hippasa sinai Alderweireldt & Jocque, 2005 — Egypt, Saudi Arabia
 Hippasa valiveruensis Patel & Reddy, 1993 — India
 Hippasa wigglesworthi Gajbe & Gajbe, 1999 — India

Hippasella
Hippasella Mello-Leitao, 1944
 Hippasella alhue Piacentini, 2011 — Argentina
 Hippasella arapensis (Strand, 1908) — Peru
 Hippasella guaquiensis (Strand, 1908) — Peru, Bolivia, Argentina

Hoggicosa
Hoggicosa Roewer, 1960
 Hoggicosa alfi Langlands & Framenau, 2010 — Australia
 Hoggicosa bicolor (Hogg, 1905) — Australia
 Hoggicosa brennani Langlands & Framenau, 2010 — Queensland, New South Wales, South Australia
 Hoggicosa castanea (Hogg, 1905) — Australia
 Hoggicosa duracki (McKay, 1975) — Western Australia
 Hoggicosa forresti (McKay, 1973) — Western Australia, South Australia
 Hoggicosa natashae Langlands & Framenau, 2010 — Queensland, New South Wales, South Australia
 Hoggicosa snelli (McKay, 1975) — Western Australia
 Hoggicosa storri (McKay, 1973) — Western Australia
 Hoggicosa wolodymyri Langlands & Framenau, 2010 — Australia

Hogna
Hogna Simon, 1885
 Hogna adjacens Roewer, 1959 — Southern Africa
 Hogna afghana (Roewer, 1960) — Afghanistan
 Hogna agadira (Roewer, 1960) — Morocco
 Hogna albemarlensis (Banks, 1902) — Galapagos Islands
 Hogna alexandria (Roewer, 1960) — Egypt
 Hogna alticeps (Kroneberg, 1875) — Central Asia
 Hogna ammophila (Wallace, 1942) — USA
 Hogna andreinii Reimoser, 1937 — Ethiopia
 Hogna angusta (Tullgren, 1901) — USA
 Hogna antelucana (Montgomery, 1904) — USA
 Hogna antiguiana Roewer, 1955 — Antigua
 Hogna archaeologica (Chamberlin, 1925) — Mexico
 Hogna argentinensis (Mello-Leitao, 1941) — Argentina
 Hogna atramentata (Karsch, 1879) — Central, East Africa
 Hogna auricoma (Keyserling, 1891) — Brazil
 Hogna badia (Keyserling, 1877) — Cuba, Central America
 Hogna balearica (Thorell, 1873) — Balearic Islands
 Hogna baliana Roewer, 1959 — Cameroon
 Hogna baltimoriana (Keyserling, 1877) — USA, Canada
 Hogna bellatrix (L. Koch, 1865) — Australia
 Hogna beniana (Strand, 1913) — Central, East Africa
 Hogna bergsoei (Thorell, 1875) — Russia, Central Asia
 Hogna bhougavia Roewer, 1960 — Afghanistan
 Hogna bicoloripes (Roewer, 1960) — Cameroon
 Hogna bimaculata (Purcell, 1903) — South Africa
 Hogna biscoitoi Wunderlich, 1992 — Madeira
 Hogna bivittata (Mello-Leitao, 1939) — Argentina
 Hogna bonifacioi Barrion & Litsinger, 1995 — Philippines
 Hogna bottegoi Caporiacco, 1940 — Ethiopia
 Hogna bowonglangi (Merian, 1911) — Sulawesi
 Hogna brevitarsis (F. O. P.-Cambridge, 1902) — Mexico to Panama
 Hogna brunnea (Bösenberg, 1895) — Canary Islands
 Hogna bruta (Karsch, 1880) — Polynesia
 Hogna burti (Hickman, 1944) — South Australia
 Hogna canariana (Roewer, 1960) — Canary Islands
 Hogna carolinensis (Walckenaer, 1805) — USA, Mexico
 Hogna chickeringi (Chamberlin & Ivie, 1936) — Panama
 Hogna cinica (Tongiorgi, 1977) — St. Helena
 Hogna coloradensis (Banks, 1894) — USA, Mexico
 Hogna colosii (Caporiacco, 1947) — Guyana
 Hogna commota (Gertsch, 1934) — Colombia
 Hogna conspersa (L. Koch, 1882) — Balearic Islands
 Hogna constricta (F. O. P.-Cambridge, 1902) — Guatemala
 Hogna cosquin (Mello-Leitao, 1941) — Argentina
 Hogna crispipes (L. Koch, 1877) — Australia, New Guinea, New Hebrides, Polynesia, New Zealand, Norfolk Islands
 Hogna dauana Roewer, 1959 — Ethiopia
 Hogna defucata Roewer, 1959 — Congo
 Hogna denisi Roewer, 1959 — South Africa
 Hogna deweti Roewer, 1959 — South Africa
 Hogna diyari Framenau, Gotch & Austin, 2006 — Queensland, New South Wales, South Australia
 Hogna duala Roewer, 1959 — Cameroon
 Hogna efformata Roewer, 1959 — Namibia
 Hogna electa Roewer, 1959 — Tanzania
 Hogna enecens Roewer, 1959 — Kenya
 Hogna ericeticola (Wallace, 1942) — USA
 Hogna espanola Baert & Maelfait, 2008 — Galapagos Islands
 Hogna estrix Roewer, 1959 — Namibia
 Hogna etoshana Roewer, 1959 — Namibia
 Hogna exigua (Roewer, 1960) — Namibia
 Hogna exsiccatella (Strand, 1916) — Guatemala
 Hogna felina (L. Koch, 1878) — Azerbaijan
 Hogna ferocella (Strand, 1916) — Canary Islands
 Hogna ferox (Lucas, 1838) — Canary Islands, Mediterranean
 Hogna filicum (Karsch, 1880) — Polynesia
 Hogna flava Roewer, 1959 — Namibia
 Hogna forsteri Caporiacco, 1955 — Venezuela
 Hogna fraissei (L. Koch, 1882) — Mallorca
 Hogna frondicola (Emerton, 1885) — USA, Canada
 Hogna furva (Thorell, 1899) — Cameroon, Sierra Leone, Bioko
 Hogna furva cingulipes (Simon, 1910) — Annobon Islands
 Hogna furvescens (Simon, 1910) — Botswana
 Hogna gabonensis Roewer, 1959 — Gabon
 Hogna galapagoensis (Banks, 1902) — Galapagos Islands
 Hogna graeca (Roewer, 1951) — Greece
 Hogna gratiosa Roewer, 1959 — Zanzibar
 Hogna grazianii (Caporiacco, 1939) — Ethiopia
 Hogna gumia (Petrunkevitch, 1911) — Bolivia
 Hogna guttatula (F. O. P.-Cambridge, 1902) — Mexico
 Hogna hawaiiensis (Simon, 1899) — Hawaii
 Hogna heeri (Thorell, 1875) — Madeira
 Hogna hendrickxi Baert & Maelfait, 2008 — Galapagos Islands
 Hogna hereroana (Roewer, 1960) — Namibia
 Hogna hibernalis (Strand, 1906) — Ethiopia
 Hogna hickmani Caporiacco, 1955 — Venezuela
 Hogna himalayensis (Gravely, 1924) — India, Bhutan, China
 Hogna hippasimorpha (Strand, 1913) — Central Africa
 Hogna idonea Roewer, 1959 — South Africa
 Hogna immansueta (Simon, 1909) — Western Australia
 Hogna indefinida (Mello-Leitao, 1941) — Argentina
 Hogna inexorabilis (O. P.-Cambridge, 1869) — St. Helena
 Hogna infulata Roewer, 1959 — South Africa
 Hogna ingens (Blackwall, 1857) — Madeira
 Hogna inhambania Roewer, 1955 — Mozambique
 Hogna inominata (Simon, 1886) — Thailand
 Hogna inops (Thorell, 1890) — Sumatra, Borneo, Sulawesi
 Hogna insulana (L. Koch, 1882) — Mallorca
 Hogna insularum (Kulczynski, 1899) — Madeira
 Hogna interrita Roewer, 1959 — Zimbabwe
 Hogna irascibilis (O. P.-Cambridge, 1885) — Turkmenistan
 Hogna irumua (Strand, 1913) — Central Africa
 Hogna jacquesbreli Baert & Maelfait, 2008 — Galapagos Islands
 Hogna jiafui Peng et al., 1997 — China
 Hogna juanensis (Strand, 1907) — Mozambique
 Hogna junco Baert & Maelfait, 2008 — Galapagos Islands
 Hogna kabwea Roewer, 1959 — Congo
 Hogna kankunda Roewer, 1959 — Congo
 Hogna karschi (Roewer, 1951) — Sao Tome
 Hogna kuyani Framenau, Gotch & Austin, 2006 — Australia
 Hogna labrea (Chamberlin & Ivie, 1942) — USA
 Hogna lacertosa (L. Koch, 1877) — South Australia
 Hogna lambarenensis (Simon, 1910) — Congo
 Hogna landanae (Simon, 1877) — West Africa, Angola
 Hogna landanella Roewer, 1959 — Angola
 Hogna lawrencei (Roewer, 1960) — South Africa
 Hogna lenta (Hentz, 1844) — USA
 Hogna leprieuri (Simon, 1876) — Algeria
 Hogna leucocephala (L. Koch, 1879) — Russia
 Hogna levis (Karsch, 1879) — West, Central Africa
 Hogna liberiaca Roewer, 1959 — Liberia
 Hogna ligata (O. P.-Cambridge, 1869) — St. Helena
 Hogna likelikeae (Simon, 1900) — Hawaii
 Hogna litigiosa Roewer, 1959 — Angola
 Hogna longitarsis (F. O. P.-Cambridge, 1902) — Mexico, Costa Rica, Panama
 Hogna luctuosa (Mello-Leitao, 1947) — Brazil
 Hogna luederitzi (Simon, 1910) — Namibia, South Africa
 Hogna lufirana (Roewer, 1960) — Congo
 Hogna lupina (Karsch, 1879) — Sri Lanka
 Hogna maasi (Gertsch & Wallace, 1937) — Mexico
 Hogna mabwensis Roewer, 1959 — Congo
 Hogna maderiana (Walckenaer, 1837) — Madeira
 Hogna magnosepta (Guy, 1966) — Morocco
 Hogna maheana Roewer, 1959 — Seychelles
 Hogna manicola (Strand, 1906) — Ethiopia
 Hogna maroccana (Roewer, 1960) — Morocco
 Hogna maruana (Roewer, 1960) — Cameroon
 Hogna massaiensis (Roewer, 1960) — Tanzania
 Hogna massauana Roewer, 1959 — Ethiopia
 Hogna maurusia (Simon, 1909) — Morocco
 Hogna medellina (Strand, 1914) — Colombia
 Hogna medica (Pocock, 1889) — Iran
 Hogna miami (Wallace, 1942) — USA
 Hogna migdilybs (Simon, 1886) — Senegal
 Hogna morosina (Banks, 1909) — Costa Rica
 Hogna munoiensis Roewer, 1959 — Congo
 Hogna nairobia (Roewer, 1960) — Kenya
 Hogna nefasta Tongiorgi, 1977 — St. Helena
 Hogna nervosa (Keyserling, 1891) — Brazil
 Hogna nigerrima (Roewer, 1960) — Tanzania
 Hogna nigrichelis (Roewer, 1955) — Iran
 Hogna nigrosecta (Mello-Leitao, 1940) — Argentina
 Hogna nimia Roewer, 1959 — Tanzania
 Hogna nonannulata Wunderlich, 1995 — Madeira
 Hogna nychthemera (Bertkau, 1880) — Brazil
 Hogna oaxacana (Gertsch & Wallace, 1937) — Mexico
 Hogna ocellata (L. Koch, 1878) — Azerbaijan
 Hogna ocyalina (Simon, 1910) — Namibia
 Hogna optabilis Roewer, 1959 — Congo
 Hogna ornata (Perty, 1833) — Brazil
 Hogna osceola (Gertsch & Wallace, 1937) — USA
 Hogna otaviensis (Roewer, 1960) — Namibia
 Hogna pardalina (Bertkau, 1880) — Brazil
 Hogna parvagenitalia (Guy, 1966) — Canary Islands
 Hogna patens Roewer, 1959 — Zimbabwe
 Hogna patricki (Purcell, 1903) — Southern Africa
 Hogna pauciguttata Roewer, 1959 — Mozambique
 Hogna persimilis (Banks, 1898) — Mexico
 Hogna perspicua Roewer, 1959 — Ethiopia
 Hogna petersi (Karsch, 1878) — Mozambique
 Hogna petiti (Simon, 1876) — Congo
 Hogna placata Roewer, 1959 — Lesotho
 Hogna planithoracis (Mello-Leitao, 1938) — Argentina
 Hogna posticata (Banks, 1904) — USA
 Hogna principum (Simon, 1910) — Principe
 Hogna propria Roewer, 1959 — Tanzania
 Hogna proterva Roewer, 1959 — Congo
 Hogna pseudoceratiola (Wallace, 1942) — USA
 Hogna pseudoradiata (Guy, 1966) — possibly Morocco
 Hogna pulchella (Keyserling, 1877) — Colombia
 Hogna pulla (Bösenberg & Lenz, 1895) — East Africa
 Hogna pulloides (Strand, 1908) — Ethiopia
 Hogna radiata (Latreille, 1817) — Central Europe to Central Asia, Central Africa
 Hogna radiata clara (Franganillo, 1913) — Spain
 Hogna radiata minor (Simon, 1876) — Mediterranean
 Hogna raffrayi (Simon, 1876) — East Africa, Zanzibar
 Hogna reducta (Bryant, 1942) — Virgin Islands
 Hogna reimoseri Roewer, 1959 — Ethiopia
 Hogna rizali Barrion & Litsinger, 1995 — Philippines
 Hogna rubetra (Schenkel, 1963) — China
 Hogna rubromandibulata (O. P.-Cambridge, 1885) — Yarkand, Karakorum
 Hogna rufimanoides (Strand, 1908) — Peru, Bolivia
 Hogna ruricolaris (Simon, 1910) — Botswana
 Hogna sanctithomasi (Petrunkevitch, 1926) — St. Thomas
 Hogna sanctivincentii (Simon, 1897) — Virgin Islands, St. Vincent
 Hogna sanisabel (Strand, 1909) — Uruguay
 Hogna sansibarensis (Strand, 1907) — Zanzibar
 Hogna schmitzi Wunderlich, 1992 — Madeira
 Hogna schreineri (Purcell, 1903) — Namibia, South Africa
 Hogna schultzei (Simon, 1910) — Namibia
 Hogna senilis (L. Koch, 1877) — New South Wales
 Hogna simoni Roewer, 1959 — Cameroon, Congo, Angola
 Hogna simplex (L. Koch, 1882) — Mallorca
 Hogna sinaia Roewer, 1959 — Egypt
 Hogna snodgrassi Banks, 1902 — Galapagos Islands
 Hogna spenceri (Pocock, 1898) — Rwanda, South Africa
 Hogna sternalis (Bertkau, 1880) — Brazil
 Hogna stictopyga (Thorell, 1895) — India, Myanmar, Singapore
 Hogna straeleni Roewer, 1959 — Congo, Rwanda, Tanzania
 Hogna subaustralis (Strand, 1908) — Peru
 Hogna subligata (L. Koch, 1877) — Queensland
 Hogna subrufa (Karsch, 1878) — Tasmania
 Hogna subtilis (Bryant, 1942) — Virgin Islands
 Hogna suprenans (Chamberlin, 1924) — USA
 Hogna swakopmundensis (Strand, 1916) — Namibia
 Hogna tantilla (Bryant, 1948) — Hispaniola
 Hogna ternetzi (Mello-Leitao, 1939) — Paraguay
 Hogna teteana Roewer, 1959 — Mozambique
 Hogna thetis (Simon, 1910) — Principe
 Hogna tigana (Gertsch & Wallace, 1935) — USA
 Hogna timuqua (Wallace, 1942) — USA
 Hogna tivior (Chamberlin & Ivie, 1936) — Panama
 Hogna tlaxcalana (Gertsch & Davis, 1940) — Mexico
 Hogna transvaalica (Simon, 1898) — South Africa
 Hogna travassosi (Mello-Leitao, 1939) — Brazil
 Hogna truculenta (O. P.-Cambridge, 1876) — Egypt
 Hogna trunca Yin, Bao & Zhang, 1996 — China
 Hogna unicolor Roewer, 1959 — Mozambique
 Hogna vachoni Caporiacco, 1954 — French Guiana
 Hogna variolosa (Mello-Leitao, 1941) — Argentina
 Hogna ventrilineata Caporiacco, 1954 — French Guiana
 Hogna volxemi (Bertkau, 1880) — Brazil
 Hogna vulpina (C. L. Koch, 1847) — Brazil
 Hogna wallacei (Chamberlin & Ivie, 1944) — USA
 Hogna watsoni (Gertsch, 1934) — USA
 Hogna willeyi (Pocock, 1899) — Bismarck Archipel
 Hogna yauliensis (Strand, 1908) — Peru
 Hogna zorodes (Mello-Leitao, 1942) — Argentina
 Hogna zuluana Roewer, 1959 — South Africa

Hognoides
Hognoides Roewer, 1960
 Hognoides ukrewea Roewer, 1960 — Tanzania
 Hognoides urbanides (Strand, 1907) — Madagascar

Hyaenosa
Hyaenosa Caporiacco, 1940
 Hyaenosa clarki (Hogg, 1912) — China
 Hyaenosa effera (O. P.-Cambridge, 1872) — North Africa, Israel, Lebanon
 Hyaenosa invasa Savelyeva, 1972 — Central Asia
 Hyaenosa ruandana Roewer, 1960 — Rwanda
 Hyaenosa strandi Caporiacco, 1940 — Ethiopia

Hygrolycosa
Hygrolycosa Dahl, 1908
 Hygrolycosa alpigena Yu & Song, 1988 — China
 Hygrolycosa rubrofasciata (Ohlert, 1865) — Palearctic
 Hygrolycosa strandi Caporiacco, 1948 — Greece
 Hygrolycosa umidicola Tanaka, 1978 — Japan

Karakumosa
Karakumosa Logunov & Ponomarev, 2020
Karakumosa alticeps (Kroneberg, 1875) – Kazakhstan
Karakumosa badkhyzica Logunov & Ponomarev, 2020 – Turkmenistan
Karakumosa gromovi Logunov & Ponomarev, 2020 – Uzbekistan
Karakumosa medica (Pocock, 1889) – Afghanistan
Karakumosa repetek Logunov & Ponomarev, 2020 (type) – Turkmenistan
Karakumosa reshetnikovi Logunov & Fomichev, 2021 – Tajikistan
Karakumosa shmatkoi Logunov & Ponomarev, 2020 – Azerbaijan, Russia (Europe), Kazakhstan
Karakumosa tashkumyr Logunov & Ponomarev, 2020 – Kyrgyzstan
Karakumosa turanica Logunov & Ponomarev, 2020 – Turkmenistan
Karakumosa zyuzini Logunov & Ponomarev, 2020 – Uzbekistan

Kangarosa
Kangarosa Framenau, 2010
 Kangarosa alboguttulata (L. Koch, 1878) — Queensland, New South Wales
 Kangarosa focarius Framenau, 2010 — Victoria
 Kangarosa ludwigi Framenau, 2010 — Queensland, New South Wales
 Kangarosa nothofagus Framenau, 2010 — Victoria
 Kangarosa ossea Framenau, 2010 — Queensland
 Kangarosa pandura Framenau, 2010 — New South Wales, Australian Capital Territory, Victoria
 Kangarosa properipes (Simon, 1909) — Western Australia
 Kangarosa tasmaniensis Framenau, 2010 — Tasmania
 Kangarosa tristicula (L. Koch, 1877) — Queensland, New South Wales
 Kangarosa yannicki Framenau, 2010 — New South Wales

Katableps
Katableps Jocque, Russell-Smith & Alderweireldt, 2011
 Katableps masoala Jocque, Russell-Smith & Alderweireldt, 2011 — Madagascar
 Katableps perinet Jocque, Russell-Smith & Alderweireldt, 2011 — Madagascar
 Katableps pudicus Jocque, Russell-Smith & Alderweireldt, 2011 — Madagascar

Knoelle
Knoelle Framenau, 2006
 Knoelle clara (L. Koch, 1877) — Australia

Lobizon
Lobizon Piacentini & Grismado, 2009
 Lobizon corondaensis (Mello-Leitao, 1941) — Argentina
 Lobizon humilis (Mello-Leitao, 1944) — Argentina
 Lobizon minor (Mello-Leitao, 1941) — Argentina
 Lobizon ojangureni Piacentini & Grismado, 2009 — Argentina
 Lobizon otamendi Piacentini & Grismado, 2009 — Argentina

Loculla
Loculla Simon, 1910
 Loculla austrocaspia Roewer, 1955 — Iran
 Loculla massaica Roewer, 1960 — Tanzania
 Loculla rauca Simon, 1910 — Sao Tome
 Loculla rauca minor Simon, 1910 — Sao Tome
 Loculla senzea Roewer, 1960 — Congo

Lycosa
Lycosa Latreille, 1804
 Lycosa abnormis Guy, 1966 — North Africa
 Lycosa accurata (Becker, 1886) — Mexico
 Lycosa adusta Banks, 1898 — Mexico
 Lycosa affinis Lucas, 1846 — Algeria
 Lycosa anclata Franganillo, 1946 — Cuba
 Lycosa apacha Chamberlin, 1925 — USA
 Lycosa approximata (O. P.-Cambridge, 1885) — Yarkand
 Lycosa aragogi Nadolny & Zamani, 2017 — Iran
 Lycosa arambagensis Biswas & Biswas, 1992 — India
 Lycosa ariadnae McKay, 1979 — Western Australia
 Lycosa articulata Costa, 1875 — Israel
 Lycosa artigasi Casanueva, 1980 — Chile
 Lycosa asiatica Sytshevskaja, 1980 — Tajikistan
 Lycosa aurea Hogg, 1896 — Central Australia
 Lycosa auroguttata (Keyserling, 1891) — Brazil
 Lycosa australicola (Strand, 1913) — Western Australia, Northern Territory
 Lycosa australis Simon, 1884 — Chile
 Lycosa balaramai Patel & Reddy, 1993 — India
 Lycosa barnesi Gravely, 1924 — India
 Lycosa baulnyi Simon, 1876 — North Africa
 Lycosa bedeli Simon, 1876 — North Africa
 Lycosa beihaiensis Yin, Bao & Zhang, 1995 — China
 Lycosa bezzii Mello-Leitao, 1944 — Argentina
 Lycosa bhatnagari Sadana, 1969 — India
 Lycosa biolleyi Banks, 1909 — Costa Rica
 Lycosa bistriata Gravely, 1924 — India, Bhutan
 Lycosa boninensis Tanaka, 1989 — Taiwan, Japan
 Lycosa bonneti Guy & Carricaburu, 1967 — Algeria
 Lycosa brunnea F. O. P.-Cambridge, 1902 — Costa Rica, Guatemala, Mexico
 Lycosa caenosa Rainbow, 1899 — New Caledonia, New Hebrides
 Lycosa canescens Schenkel, 1963 — China
 Lycosa capensis Simon, 1898 — South Africa
 Lycosa carbonelli Costa & Capocasale, 1984 — Uruguay
 Lycosa carmichaeli Gravely, 1924 — India
 Lycosa cerrofloresiana Petrunkevitch, 1925 — El Salvador to Panama
 Lycosa chaperi Simon, 1885 — India, Pakistan
 Lycosa choudhuryi Tikader & Malhotra, 1980 — India, China
 Lycosa cingara (C. L. Koch, 1847) — Egypt
 Lycosa clarissa Roewer, 1951 — Spain
 Lycosa coelestis L. Koch, 1878 — China, Korea, Japan
 Lycosa connexa Roewer, 1960 — South Africa
 Lycosa contestata Montgomery, 1903 — USA
 Lycosa corallina McKay, 1974 — Australia
 Lycosa coreana Paik, 1994 — Korea
 Lycosa cowlei Hogg, 1896 — Central Australia
 Lycosa cretacea Simon, 1898 — North Africa
 Lycosa dacica (Pavesi, 1898) — Romania
 Lycosa danjiangensis Yin, Zhao & Bao, 1997 — China
 Lycosa dilatata F. O. P.-Cambridge, 1902 — Mexico to El Salvador
 Lycosa dimota Simon, 1909 — Western Australia
 Lycosa discolor Walckenaer, 1837 — USA
 Lycosa elysae Tongiorgi, 1977 — St. Helena
 Lycosa emuncta Banks, 1898 — Mexico
 Lycosa erjianensis Yin & Zhao, 1996 — China
 Lycosa erythrognatha Lucas, 1836 — Brazil, Uruguay, Paraguay, Argentina
 Lycosa eutypa Chamberlin, 1925 — Panama
 Lycosa falconensis Schenkel, 1953 — Venezuela
 Lycosa fasciiventris Dufour, 1835 — Spain, Morocco
 Lycosa fernandezi (F. O. P.-Cambridge, 1899) — Juan Fernandez Islands
 Lycosa ferriculosa Chamberlin, 1919 — USA
 Lycosa formosana Saito, 1936 — Taiwan
 Lycosa frigens (Kulczynski, 1916) — Russia
 Lycosa fuscana Pocock, 1901 — India
 Lycosa futilis Banks, 1898 — Mexico
 Lycosa geotubalis Tikader & Malhotra, 1980 — India
 Lycosa gibsoni McKay, 1979 — Western Australia
 Lycosa gigantea (Roewer, 1960) — South Africa
 Lycosa gilberta Hogg, 1905 — New South Wales, Victoria, South Australia
 Lycosa gobiensis Schenkel, 1936 — Mongolia, China
 Lycosa godeffroyi L. Koch, 1865 — Australia
 Lycosa goliathus Pocock, 1901 — India
 Lycosa grahami Fox, 1935 — China
 Lycosa guayaquiliana Mello-Leitao, 1939 — Ecuador
 Lycosa hickmani (Roewer, 1955) — New Guinea, Northern Australia
 Lycosa hildegardae Casanueva, 1980 — Chile
 Lycosa hispanica (Walckenaer, 1837) — Spain
 Lycosa hispanica dufouri (Strand, 1916) — Spain
 Lycosa horrida (Keyserling, 1877) — Colombia
 Lycosa howarthi Gertsch, 1973 — Hawaii
 Lycosa illicita Gertsch, 1934 — Mexico
 Lycosa immanis L. Koch, 1879 — Russia
 Lycosa impavida Walckenaer, 1837 — USA
 Lycosa implacida Nicolet, 1849 — Chile
 Lycosa indagatrix Walckenaer, 1837 — India, Sri Lanka
 Lycosa indomita Nicolet, 1849 — Chile
 Lycosa infesta Walckenaer, 1837 — USA
 Lycosa injusta Banks, 1898 — Mexico
 Lycosa innocua Doleschall, 1859 — Amboina
 Lycosa inornata Blackwall, 1862 — Brazil
 Lycosa insulana (Bryant, 1923) — Barbados
 Lycosa insularis Lucas, 1857 — Cuba
 Lycosa intermedialis Roewer, 1955 — Libya
 Lycosa interstitialis (Strand, 1906) — Algeria
 Lycosa inviolata Roewer, 1960 — South Africa
 Lycosa iranii Pocock, 1901 — India
 Lycosa ishikariana (Saito, 1934) — Russia, Japan
 Lycosa isolata Bryant, 1940 — Cuba
 Lycosa jagadalpurensis Gajbe, 2004 — India
 Lycosa kempi Gravely, 1924 — India, Pakistan, Bhutan, China
 Lycosa koyuga McKay, 1979 — Western Australia
 Lycosa labialis Mao & Song, 1985 — China, Korea
 Lycosa labialisoides Peng et al., 1997 — China
 Lycosa laeta L. Koch, 1877 — Eastern Australia
 Lycosa lambai Tikader & Malhotra, 1980 — India
 Lycosa langei Mello-Leitao, 1947 — Brazil
 Lycosa lativulva F. O. P.-Cambridge, 1902 — Guatemala
 Lycosa lebakensis Doleschall, 1859 — Java
 Lycosa leuckarti (Thorell, 1870) — Australia
 Lycosa leucogastra Mello-Leitao, 1944 — Argentina
 Lycosa leucophaeoides (Roewer, 1951) — Queensland
 Lycosa leucophthalma Mello-Leitao, 1940 — Argentina
 Lycosa leucotaeniata (Mello-Leitao, 1947) — Brazil
 Lycosa liliputana Nicolet, 1849 — Chile
 Lycosa longivulva F. O. P.-Cambridge, 1902 — Guatemala
 Lycosa macedonica (Giltay, 1932) — Macedonia
 Lycosa mackenziei Gravely, 1924 — Pakistan, India, Bangladesh
 Lycosa maculata Butt, Anwar & Tahir, 2006 — Pakistan
 Lycosa madagascariensis Vinson, 1863 — Madagascar
 Lycosa madani Pocock, 1901 — India
 Lycosa magallanica Karsch, 1880 — Chile
 Lycosa magnifica Hu, 2001 — China
 Lycosa mahabaleshwarensis Tikader & Malhotra, 1980 — India
 Lycosa masteri Pocock, 1901 — India
 Lycosa matusitai Nakatsudi, 1943 — Japan to Micronesia
 Lycosa maya Chamberlin, 1925 — Mexico
 Lycosa mexicana Banks, 1898 — Mexico
 Lycosa minae (Dönitz & Strand, 1906) — Japan
 Lycosa molyneuxi Hogg, 1905 — New South Wales
 Lycosa mordax Walckenaer, 1837 — USA
 Lycosa moulmeinensis Gravely, 1924 — Myanmar
 Lycosa mukana Roewer, 1960 — Congo
 Lycosa munieri Simon, 1876 — North Africa
 Lycosa muntea (Roewer, 1960) — Congo
 Lycosa musgravei McKay, 1974 — New South Wales, Victoria
 Lycosa niceforoi Mello-Leitao, 1941 — Colombia
 Lycosa nigricans Butt, Anwar & Tahir, 2006 — Pakistan
 Lycosa nigromarmorata Mello-Leitao, 1941 — Colombia
 Lycosa nigropunctata Rainbow, 1915 — South Australia
 Lycosa nigrotaeniata Mello-Leitao, 1941 — Colombia
 Lycosa nigrotibialis Simon, 1884 — India, Bhutan, Myanmar
 Lycosa nilotica Audouin, 1826 — Egypt
 Lycosa nordenskjoldi Tullgren, 1905 — Brazil, Bolivia
 Lycosa oculata Simon, 1876 — Western Mediterranean
 Lycosa ovalata Franganillo, 1930 — Cuba
 Lycosa pachana Pocock, 1898 — Central, Southern Africa
 Lycosa palliata Roewer, 1960 — South Africa
 Lycosa pampeana Holmberg, 1876 — Paraguay, Argentina
 Lycosa paranensis Holmberg, 1876 — Brazil, Argentina
 Lycosa parvipudens Karsch, 1881 — Gilbert Islands
 Lycosa patagonica Simon, 1886 — Chile
 Lycosa pavlovi Schenkel, 1953 — China
 Lycosa perkinsi Simon, 1904 — Hawaii
 Lycosa perspicua Roewer, 1960 — South Africa
 Lycosa philadelphiana Walckenaer, 1837 — USA
 Lycosa phipsoni Pocock, 1899 — India to China, Taiwan
 Lycosa phipsoni leucophora (Thorell, 1887) — Myanmar
 Lycosa pia (Bösenberg & Strand, 1906) — Japan
 Lycosa pictipes (Keyserling, 1891) — Brazil, Argentina
 Lycosa pictula Pocock, 1901 — India
 Lycosa pintoi Mello-Leitao, 1931 — Brazil
 Lycosa piochardi Simon, 1876 — Syria
 Lycosa piochardi infraclara (Strand, 1915) — Israel
 Lycosa poliostoma (C. L. Koch, 1847) — Brazil, Paraguay, Uruguay, Argentina
 Lycosa poonaensis Tikader & Malhotra, 1980 — India
 Lycosa porteri Simon, 1904 — Chile
 Lycosa praegrandis C. L. Koch, 1836 — Greece to Central Asia
 Lycosa praegrandis discoloriventer Caporiacco, 1949 — Albania
 Lycosa praestans Roewer, 1960 — Botswana
 Lycosa proletarioides Mello-Leitao, 1941 — Argentina
 Lycosa prolifica Pocock, 1901 — India
 Lycosa pulchella (Thorell, 1881) — New Guinea, Bismarck Archipel
 Lycosa punctiventralis (Roewer, 1951) — Mexico
 Lycosa quadrimaculata Lucas, 1858 — Gabon
 Lycosa rimicola Purcell, 1903 — South Africa
 Lycosa ringens Tongiorgi, 1977 — St. Helena
 Lycosa rostrata Franganillo, 1930 — Cuba
 Lycosa rufisterna Schenkel, 1953 — China
 Lycosa russea Schenkel, 1953 — China
 Lycosa sabulosa (O. P.-Cambridge, 1885) — Yarkand
 Lycosa salifodina McKay, 1976 — Western Australia
 Lycosa salvadorensis Kraus, 1955 — El Salvador
 Lycosa separata (Roewer, 1960) — Mozambique
 Lycosa septembris (Strand, 1906) — Ethiopia
 Lycosa sericovittata Mello-Leitao, 1939 — Brazil
 Lycosa serranoa Tullgren, 1901 — Chile
 Lycosa shahapuraensis Gajbe, 2004 — India
 Lycosa shaktae Bhandari & Gajbe, 2001 — India
 Lycosa shansia (Hogg, 1912) — China, Mongolia
 Lycosa shillongensis Tikader & Malhotra, 1980 — India
 Lycosa signata Lenz, 1886 — Madagascar
 Lycosa signiventris Banks, 1909 — El Salvador, Costa Rica
 Lycosa sigridae (Strand, 1917) — Mexico
 Lycosa similis Banks, 1892 — USA
 Lycosa singoriensis (Laxmann, 1770) — Palearctic
 Lycosa sochoi Mello-Leitao, 1947 — Brazil
 Lycosa storeniformis Simon, 1910 — Guinea-Bissau
 Lycosa subfusca F. O. P.-Cambridge, 1902 — Mexico, Costa Rica
 Lycosa suzukii Yaginuma, 1960 — Russia, China, Korea, Japan
 Lycosa sylvatica (Roewer, 1951) — Algeria
 Lycosa tarantula (Linnaeus, 1758) — Southeastern Europe, Mediterranean, Near East
 Lycosa tarantula carsica Caporiacco, 1949 — Italy
 Lycosa tarantula cisalpina Simon, 1937 — France
 Lycosa tarantuloides Perty, 1833 — Brazil
 Lycosa tasmanicola Roewer, 1960 — Tasmania
 Lycosa teranganicola (Strand, 1911) — Aru Islands
 Lycosa terrestris Butt, Anwar & Tahir, 2006 — Pakistan
 Lycosa tetrophthalma Mello-Leitao, 1939 — Paraguay
 Lycosa thoracica Patel & Reddy, 1993 — India
 Lycosa thorelli (Keyserling, 1877) — Colombia to Argentina
 Lycosa tista Tikader, 1970 — India
 Lycosa transversa F. O. P.-Cambridge, 1902 — Guatemala
 Lycosa trichopus (Roewer, 1960) — Afghanistan
 Lycosa tula (Strand, 1913) — Western Australia
 Lycosa u-album Mello-Leitao, 1938 — Argentina
 Lycosa vachoni Guy, 1966 — Algeria
 Lycosa vellutina Mello-Leitao, 1941 — Colombia
 Lycosa ventralis F. O. P.-Cambridge, 1902 — Mexico
 Lycosa vittata Yin, Bao & Zhang, 1995 — China
 Lycosa wadaiensis Roewer, 1960 — Chad
 Lycosa wangi Yin, Peng & Wang, 1996 — China
 Lycosa woonda McKay, 1979 — Western Australia
 Lycosa wroughtoni Pocock, 1899 — India
 Lycosa wulsini Fox, 1935 — China
 Lycosa yalkara McKay, 1979 — Western Australia
 Lycosa yerburyi Pocock, 1901 — Sri Lanka
 Lycosa yizhangensis Yin, Peng & Wang, 1996 — China
 Lycosa yunnanensis Yin, Peng & Wang, 1996 — China

Lycosella
Lycosella Thorell, 1890
 Lycosella annulata Simon, 1900 — Hawaii
 Lycosella minuta Thorell, 1890 — Sumatra
 Lycosella spinipes Simon, 1900 — Hawaii
 Lycosella tenera Thorell, 1890 — Sumatra
 Lycosella tenera bisulcata Thorell, 1890 — Sumatra

Lysania
Lysania Thorell, 1890
 Lysania deangia Li, Wang & Zhang, 2013 — China
 Lysania pygmaea Thorell, 1890 — China, Malaysia
 Lysania sabahensis Lehtinen & Hippa, 1979 — Borneo

Mainosa
Mainosa Framenau, 2006
 Mainosa longipes (L. Koch, 1878) — Western Australia, South Australia

Malimbosa
Malimbosa Roewer, 1960
 Malimbosa lamperti (Strand, 1906) — West Africa

Margonia
Margonia Hippa & Lehtinen, 1983
 Margonia himalayensis (Gravely, 1924) — India

Megarctosa
Megarctosa Caporiacco, 1948
 Megarctosa aequioculata (Strand, 1906) — Ethiopia
 Megarctosa argentata (Denis, 1947) — North Africa
 Megarctosa bamiana Roewer, 1960 — Afghanistan
 Megarctosa caporiaccoi Roewer, 1960 — Cameroon
 Megarctosa gobiensis (Schenkel, 1936) — Mongolia
 Megarctosa melanostoma (Mello-Leitao, 1941) — Argentina
 Megarctosa naccai Caporiacco, 1948 — Greece

Melocosa
Melocosa Gertsch, 1937
 Melocosa fumosa (Emerton, 1894) — USA, Canada, Alaska
 Melocosa gertschi Mello-Leitao, 1947 — Brazil

Minicosa
Minicosa Alderweireldt & Jocque, 2007
 Minicosa neptuna Alderweireldt & Jocque, 2007 — South Africa

Molitorosa
Molitorosa Roewer, 1960
 Molitorosa molitor (Bertkau, 1880) — Brazil

Mongolicosa
Mongolicosa Marusik, Azarkina & Koponen, 2004
 Mongolicosa buryatica Marusik, Azarkina & Koponen, 2004 — Russia
 Mongolicosa glupovi Marusik, Azarkina & Koponen, 2004 — Russia
 Mongolicosa gobiensis Marusik, Azarkina & Koponen, 2004 — Mongolia
 Mongolicosa mongolensis Marusik, Azarkina & Koponen, 2004 — Mongolia
 Mongolicosa pseudoferruginea (Schenkel, 1936) — China
 Mongolicosa songi Marusik, Azarkina & Koponen, 2004 — Mongolia, China

Mustelicosa
Mustelicosa Roewer, 1960
 Mustelicosa dimidiata (Thorell, 1875) — Russia, Ukraine, Turkmenistan, Mongolia, China
 Mustelicosa ordosa (Hogg, 1912) — China

Navira
Navira Piacentini & Grismado, 2009
 Navira naguan Piacentini & Grismado, 2009 — Argentina

Notocosa
Notocosa Vink, 2002
 Notocosa bellicosa (Goyen, 1888) — New Zealand

Oculicosa
Oculicosa Zyuzin, 1993
 Oculicosa supermirabilis Zyuzin, 1993 — Kazakhstan, Uzbekistan, Turkmenistan

Ocyale
Ocyale Audouin, 1826
 Ocyale dewinterae Alderweireldt, 1996 — Malawi, Namibia
 Ocyale discrepans Roewer, 1960 — Ethiopia
 Ocyale fera Strand, 1908 — Madagascar
 Ocyale grandis Alderweireldt, 1996 — Togo, Congo, Namibia
 Ocyale guttata (Karsch, 1878) — Tanzania to South Africa
 Ocyale huachoi (Mello-Leitao, 1942) — Peru
 Ocyale kalpiensis Gajbe, 2004 — India
 Ocyale kumari Dyal, 1935 — Pakistan
 Ocyale lanca (Karsch, 1879) — Sri Lanka
 Ocyale pelliona (Audouin, 1826) — North Africa
 Ocyale pilosa (Roewer, 1960) — West Africa to Myanmar
 Ocyale qiongzhongensis Yin & Peng, 1997 — China

Orinocosa
Orinocosa Chamberlin, 1916
 Orinocosa aymara Chamberlin, 1916 — Peru
 Orinocosa celerierae Cornic, 1976 — Ivory Coast
 Orinocosa guentheri (Pocock, 1899) — Iran
 Orinocosa hansi (Strand, 1916) — Southern Africa
 Orinocosa paraguensis (Gertsch & Wallace, 1937) — Paraguay
 Orinocosa priesneri Roewer, 1959 — Egypt
 Orinocosa pulchra Caporiacco, 1947 — Guyana
 Orinocosa securifer (Tullgren, 1905) — Argentina
 Orinocosa stirlingae (Hogg, 1905) — New South Wales
 Orinocosa tropica Roewer, 1959 — Uganda

Orthocosa
Orthocosa Roewer, 1960
 Orthocosa ambigua (Denis, 1947) — Egypt
 Orthocosa orophila (Thorell, 1887) — Myanmar
 Orthocosa semicincta (L. Koch, 1877) — Queensland
 Orthocosa sternomaculata (Mello-Leitao, 1943) — Brazil
 Orthocosa tokunagai (Saito, 1936) — China

Paratrochosina
Paratrochosina Roewer, 1960
 Paratrochosina amica (Mello-Leitao, 1941) — Argentina
 Paratrochosina insolita (L. Koch, 1879) — Canada, Alaska, Russia
 Paratrochosina sagittigera (Roewer, 1951) — Russia

Pardosa
Pardosa C. L. Koch, 1847
 Pardosa abagensis Ovtsharenko, 1979 — Russia, Abkhazia
 Pardosa aciculifera Chen, Song & Li, 2001 — China
 Pardosa acorensis Simon, 1883 — Azores
 Pardosa adustella (Roewer, 1951) — Russia, Mongolia, China
 Pardosa aenigmatica Tongiorgi, 1966 — Italy, Turkey, Azerbaijan
 Pardosa afflicta (Holmberg, 1876) — Argentina
 Pardosa agrestis (Westring, 1861) — Palearctic
 Pardosa agrestis purbeckensis F. O. P.-Cambridge, 1895 — Western, Central Europe
 Pardosa agricola (Thorell, 1856) — Europe to Kazakhstan
 Pardosa agricola borussica (Dahl, 1908) — Lithuania
 Pardosa agricola fucicola (Dahl, 1908) — Finland, Germany
 Pardosa alacris (C. L. Koch, 1833) — Europe, Russia
 Pardosa alasaniensis Mcheidze, 1997 — Georgia
 Pardosa albatula (Roewer, 1951) — Europe
 Pardosa alboannulata Yin et al., 1997 — China
 Pardosa albomaculata Emerton, 1885 — USA, Canada, Alaska, Greenland
 Pardosa algens (Kulczynski, 1908) — Canada, Alaska, Russia
 Pardosa algina (Chamberlin, 1916) — Peru
 Pardosa algoides Schenkel, 1963 — India, Bangladesh, China
 Pardosa alii Tikader, 1977 — India
 Pardosa altamontis Chamberlin & Ivie, 1946 — USA, Canada
 Pardosa alticola Alderweireldt & Jocque, 1992 — Ethiopia, Congo, Rwanda
 Pardosa altitudis Tikader & Malhotra, 1980 — India, China
 Pardosa amacuzacensis Jimenez, 1983 — Mexico
 Pardosa amamiensis (Nakatsudi, 1943) — Ryukyu Islands
 Pardosa amazonia (Thorell, 1895) — Myanmar
 Pardosa amentata (Clerck, 1757) — Europe, Russia
 Pardosa amkhasensis Tikader & Malhotra, 1976 — India
 Pardosa anchoroides Yu & Song, 1988 — China
 Pardosa ancorifera Schenkel, 1936 — China
 Pardosa anfibia Zapfe-Mann, 1979 — Chile
 Pardosa angolensis (Roewer, 1959) — Angola
 Pardosa angusta Denis, 1956 — Morocco
 Pardosa angustifrons Caporiacco, 1941 — Ethiopia
 Pardosa anomala Gertsch, 1933 — USA, Canada
 Pardosa apostoli Barrion & Litsinger, 1995 — Philippines
 Pardosa aquatilis Schmidt & Krause, 1995 — Cape Verde Islands
 Pardosa aquila Buchar & Thaler, 1998 — Russia, Georgia
 Pardosa arctica (Kulczynski, 1916) — Russia
 Pardosa astrigera L. Koch, 1878 — Russia, China, Korea, Taiwan, Japan
 Pardosa atlantica Emerton, 1913 — USA
 Pardosa atomaria (C. L. Koch, 1847) — Balkans, Cyprus, Rhodes, Aegean Islands
 Pardosa atrata (Thorell, 1873) — Palearctic
 Pardosa atromedia Banks, 1904 — USA
 Pardosa atronigra Song, 1995 — China
 Pardosa atropos (L. Koch, 1878) — China, Korea, Japan
 Pardosa aurantipes (Strand, 1906) — Ethiopia
 Pardosa azerifalcata Marusik, Guseinov & Koponen, 2003 — Azerbaijan
 Pardosa baehrorum Kronestedt, 1999 — Germany, Switzerland, Austria
 Pardosa balaghatensis Gajbe, 2004 — India
 Pardosa baoshanensis Wang & Qiu, 1991 — China
 Pardosa baraan Logunov & Marusik, 1995 — Russia, Mongolia
 Pardosa bargaonensis Gajbe, 2004 — India
 Pardosa basiri (Dyal, 1935) — Pakistan
 Pardosa bastarensis Gajbe, 2004 — India
 Pardosa baxianensis Wang & Song, 1993 — China
 Pardosa beijiangensis Hu & Wu, 1989 — China
 Pardosa bellona Banks, 1898 — USA, Mexico
 Pardosa benadira Caporiacco, 1940 — Ethiopia
 Pardosa bendamira Roewer, 1960 — Afghanistan
 Pardosa beringiana Dondale & Redner, 1987 — Canada, Alaska
 Pardosa bidentata Franganillo, 1936 — Cuba
 Pardosa bifasciata (C. L. Koch, 1834) — Palearctic
 Pardosa birabeni Mello-Leitao, 1938 — Argentina
 Pardosa birmanica Simon, 1884 — Pakistan to China, Philippines, Sumatra
 Pardosa blanda (C. L. Koch, 1833) — Palearctic
 Pardosa bleyi (Dahl, 1908) — Bismarck Archipel
 Pardosa brevimetatarsis (Strand, 1907) — Java
 Pardosa brevivulva Tanaka, 1975 — Russia, China, Korea, Japan
 Pardosa brunellii Caporiacco, 1940 — Ethiopia
 Pardosa buchari Ovtsharenko, 1979 — Russia, Georgia, Iran
 Pardosa bucklei Kronestedt, 1975 — USA, Canada
 Pardosa bukukun Logunov & Marusik, 1995 — Russia, Mongolia, China
 Pardosa burasantiensis Tikader & Malhotra, 1976 — India, China
 Pardosa buriatica Sternbergs, 1979 — Russia
 Pardosa californica Keyserling, 1887 — USA, Mexico
 Pardosa caliraya Barrion & Litsinger, 1995 — Philippines
 Pardosa canalis F. O. P.-Cambridge, 1902 — Mexico
 Pardosa caucasica Ovtsharenko, 1979 — Russia, Abkhazia, Azerbaijan
 Pardosa cavannae Simon, 1881 — Italy, Albania
 Pardosa cayennensis (Taczanowski, 1874) — French Guiana
 Pardosa cervina Schenkel, 1936 — China
 Pardosa cervinopilosa Schenkel, 1936 — China
 Pardosa chahraka Roewer, 1960 — Afghanistan
 Pardosa chambaensis Tikader & Malhotra, 1976 — India
 Pardosa chapini (Fox, 1935) — China
 Pardosa chenbuensis Yin et al., 1997 — China
 Pardosa chiapasiana Gertsch & Wallace, 1937 — Mexico
 Pardosa chindanda Roewer, 1960 — Afghanistan
 Pardosa cincta (Kulczynski, 1887) — Central, Eastern Europe
 Pardosa cinerascens (Roewer, 1951) — Madagascar
 Pardosa clavipalpis Purcell, 1903 — East, South Africa
 Pardosa cluens Roewer, 1959 — Cameroon
 Pardosa colchica Mcheidze, 1946 — Georgia, Armenia, Azerbaijan
 Pardosa coloradensis Banks, 1894 — USA, Canada, Alaska
 Pardosa completa (Roewer, 1959) — Mozambique
 Pardosa concinna (Thorell, 1877) — USA, Canada
 Pardosa concolorata (Roewer, 1951) — Mexico
 Pardosa condolens (O. P.-Cambridge, 1885) — Central Asia
 Pardosa confalonierii Caporiacco, 1928 — North Africa
 Pardosa confusa Kronestedt, 1988 — USA
 Pardosa consimilis Nosek, 1905 — Turkey
 Pardosa costrica Chamberlin & Ivie, 1942 — Costa Rica
 Pardosa crassipalpis Purcell, 1903 — South Africa
 Pardosa crassistyla Kronestedt, 1988 — USA
 Pardosa credula (O. P.-Cambridge, 1885) — Tajikistan
 Pardosa cribrata Simon, 1876 — Southern Europe, Algeria
 Pardosa cribrata catalonica Simon, 1937 — Spain
 Pardosa cubana Bryant, 1940 — Cuba, Jamaica, Grand Cayman Islands
 Pardosa dabiensis Chai & Yang, 1998 — China
 Pardosa dagestana Buchar & Thaler, 1998 — Russia
 Pardosa daisetsuensis Tanaka, 2005 — Japan
 Pardosa dalkhaba Roewer, 1960 — Afghanistan
 Pardosa danica (Sørensen, 1904) — Denmark
 Pardosa darolii (Strand, 1906) — Ethiopia
 Pardosa datongensis Yin, Peng & Kim, 1997 — China
 Pardosa debolinae Majumder, 2004 — India
 Pardosa delicatula Gertsch & Wallace, 1935 — USA, Mexico
 Pardosa dentitegulum Yin et al., 1997 — China
 Pardosa desolatula Gertsch & Davis, 1940 — Mexico
 Pardosa dilecta Banks, 1898 — Mexico
 Pardosa distincta (Blackwall, 1846) — USA, Canada
 Pardosa diuturna Fox, 1937 — Canada, Alaska
 Pardosa donabila Roewer, 1955 — Iran
 Pardosa dondalei Jimenez, 1986 — Mexico
 Pardosa dorsalis Banks, 1894 — USA, Canada
 Pardosa dorsuncata Lowrie & Dondale, 1981 — USA, Canada, Alaska
 Pardosa dranensis Hogg, 1922 — Vietnam
 Pardosa drenskii Buchar, 1968 — Bulgaria
 Pardosa duplicata Saha, Biswas & Raychaudhuri, 1994 — India
 Pardosa dzheminey Marusik, 1995 — Kazakhstan
 Pardosa ecatli Jimenez, 1985 — Mexico
 Pardosa eiseni (Thorell, 1875) — Palearctic
 Pardosa ejusmodi (O. P.-Cambridge, 1872) — Syria
 Pardosa elegans (Thorell, 1875) — Russia
 Pardosa elegantula (Roewer, 1959) — Congo
 Pardosa enucleata Roewer, 1959 — South Africa
 Pardosa erupticia (Strand, 1913) — Rwanda
 Pardosa eskovi Kronestedt & Marusik, 2011 — Russia
 Pardosa evanescens Alderweireldt & Jocque, 2008 — Ivory Coast
 Pardosa evelinae Wunderlich, 1984 — Eastern Europe
 Pardosa falcata Schenkel, 1963 — Mongolia, China
 Pardosa falcifera F. O. P.-Cambridge, 1902 — USA to Costa Rica
 Pardosa falcula F. O. P.-Cambridge, 1902 — Guatemala
 Pardosa fallax Barnes, 1959 — Mexico
 Pardosa fastosa (Keyserling, 1877) — Costa Rica to Ecuador
 Pardosa fastosa viota (Strand, 1914) — Colombia
 Pardosa femoralis Simon, 1876 — France, Spain, Russia
 Pardosa fengi Marusik, Nadolny & Omelko, 2013 — China
 Pardosa ferruginea (L. Koch, 1870) — Palearctic
 Pardosa flammula Mello-Leitao, 1945 — Argentina
 Pardosa flata Qu, Peng & Yin, 2010 — China
 Pardosa flavida (O. P.-Cambridge, 1885) — Yarkand, Turkmenistan, China
 Pardosa flavipalpis F. O. P.-Cambridge, 1902 — Mexico
 Pardosa flavipes Hu, 2001 — China
 Pardosa flavisterna Caporiacco, 1935 — Pakistan, India
 Pardosa fletcheri (Gravely, 1924) — Pakistan, India, Nepal
 Pardosa floridana (Banks, 1896) — USA, Cuba
 Pardosa fortunata (O. P.-Cambridge, 1885) — Central Asia
 Pardosa fritzeni Ballarin et al., 2012 — Kyrgyzstan
 Pardosa fulvipes (Collett, 1876) — Palearctic
 Pardosa furcifera (Thorell, 1875) — Canada, Alaska, Greenland, Iceland
 Pardosa fuscosoma Wunderlich, 1992 — Canary Islands
 Pardosa fuscula (Thorell, 1875) — USA, Canada, Alaska
 Pardosa gastropicta Roewer, 1959 — Kenya
 Pardosa gefsana Roewer, 1959 — Spain, Sicily, Sardinia, North Africa
 Pardosa gerhardti (Strand, 1922) — Sumatra
 Pardosa ghigii Caporiacco, 1932 — Morocco
 Pardosa ghourbanda Roewer, 1960 — Afghanistan
 Pardosa giebeli (Pavesi, 1873) — Europe
 Pardosa glabra Mello-Leitao, 1938 — Argentina
 Pardosa glacialis (Thorell, 1872) — Holarctic
 Pardosa golbagha Roewer, 1960 — Afghanistan
 Pardosa gopalai Patel & Reddy, 1993 — India
 Pardosa gothicana Lowrie & Dondale, 1981 — USA
 Pardosa gracilenta (Lucas, 1846) — Algeria
 Pardosa graminea Tanaka, 1985 — China, Japan
 Pardosa groenlandica (Thorell, 1872) — Russia, Alaska, Canada, USA, Greenland
 Pardosa gromovi Ballarin et al., 2012 — Kazakhstan
 Pardosa guadalajarana Dondale & Redner, 1984 — Mexico to El Salvador
 Pardosa guerechka Roewer, 1960 — Afghanistan
 Pardosa gusarensis Marusik, Guseinov & Koponen, 2003 — Azerbaijan
 Pardosa haibeiensis Yin et al., 1995 — China
 Pardosa hamifera F. O. P.-Cambridge, 1902 — Mexico, Honduras, Jamaica, Hispaniola
 Pardosa hartmanni (Roewer, 1959) — Tanzania
 Pardosa hatanensis Urita, Tang & Song, 1993 — China
 Pardosa haupti Song, 1995 — China
 Pardosa hedini Schenkel, 1936 — Russia, China, Korea, Japan
 Pardosa herbosa Jo & Paik, 1984 — Russia, China, Korea, Japan
 Pardosa hetchi Chamberlin & Ivie, 1942 — USA
 Pardosa heterophthalma (Simon, 1898) — India to Java
 Pardosa hohxilensis Song, 1995 — China
 Pardosa hokkaido Tanaka & Suwa, 1986 — Russia, Japan
 Pardosa hortensis (Thorell, 1872) — Palearctic
 Pardosa hydaspis Caporiacco, 1935 — Karakorum
 Pardosa hyperborea (Thorell, 1872) — Holarctic
 Pardosa hypocrita (Simon, 1882) — Yemen
 Pardosa ibex Buchar & Thaler, 1998 — Russia, Georgia
 Pardosa ilgunensis Nosek, 1905 — Turkey
 Pardosa incerta Nosek, 1905 — Turkey, Russia, Azerbaijan
 Pardosa indecora L. Koch, 1879 — Russia, China
 Pardosa iniqua (O. P.-Cambridge, 1876) — Egypt
 Pardosa injucunda (O. P.-Cambridge, 1876) — Africa
 Pardosa inopina (O. P.-Cambridge, 1876) — Egypt to East Africa
 Pardosa inquieta (O. P.-Cambridge, 1876) — Egypt
 Pardosa intermedia (Bösenberg, 1903) — Germany
 Pardosa invenusta (C. L. Koch, 1837) — Greece
 Pardosa irretita Simon, 1886 — Thailand, Malaysia, Borneo
 Pardosa irriensis Barrion & Litsinger, 1995 — Philippines
 Pardosa isago Tanaka, 1977 — Russia, China, Korea, Japan
 Pardosa italica Tongiorgi, 1966 — Southern Europe to China
 Pardosa italica valenta Zyuzin, 1976 — Central Asia
 Pardosa izabella Chamberlin & Ivie, 1942 — Guatemala
 Pardosa jabalpurensis Gajbe & Gajbe, 1999 — India
 Pardosa jaikensis Ponomarev, 2007 — Russia, Kazakhstan
 Pardosa jambaruensis Tanaka, 1990 — China, Taiwan, Okinawa
 Pardosa jartica Urita, Tang & Song, 1993 — China
 Pardosa jaundea (Roewer, 1960) — Cameroon
 Pardosa jeniseica Eskov & Marusik, 1995 — Russia, Kazakhstan
 Pardosa jergeniensis Ponomarev, 1979 — Russia, Kazakhstan
 Pardosa jinpingensis Yin et al., 1997 — China
 Pardosa josemitensis (Strand, 1908) — USA
 Pardosa kalpiensis Gajbe, 2004 — India
 Pardosa karagonis (Strand, 1913) — Central, East Africa
 Pardosa karagonis nivicola Lessert, 1926 — Tanzania
 Pardosa katangana Roewer, 1959 — Congo
 Pardosa kavango Alderweireldt & Jocque, 1992 — Namibia, Botswana
 Pardosa knappi Dondale, 2007 — USA
 Pardosa kondeana Roewer, 1959 — East Africa
 Pardosa krausi (Roewer, 1959) — Tanzania
 Pardosa kronestedti Song, Zhang & Zhu, 2002 — China
 Pardosa kupupa (Tikader, 1970) — India, China
 Pardosa labradorensis (Thorell, 1875) — USA, Canada
 Pardosa laciniata Song & Haupt, 1995 — China
 Pardosa laevitarsis Tanaka & Suwa, 1986 — Japan, Okinawa
 Pardosa lagenaria Qu, Peng & Yin, 2010 — China
 Pardosa laidlawi Simon, 1901 — Malaysia
 Pardosa lapidicina Emerton, 1885 — USA, Canada
 Pardosa lapponica (Thorell, 1872) — Holarctic
 Pardosa lasciva L. Koch, 1879 — Palearctic
 Pardosa latibasa Qu, Peng & Yin, 2010 — China
 Pardosa laura Karsch, 1879 — Russia, China, Korea, Taiwan, Japan
 Pardosa lawrencei Roewer, 1959 — Tanzania
 Pardosa leipoldti Purcell, 1903 — South Africa
 Pardosa leprevosti Mello-Leitao, 1947 — Brazil
 Pardosa lignosus Ghafoor & Alvi, 2007 — Pakistan
 Pardosa lii Marusik, Nadolny & Omelko, 2013 — China
 Pardosa limata Roewer, 1959 — Namibia
 Pardosa lineata F. O. P.-Cambridge, 1902 — Mexico
 Pardosa linguata F. O. P.-Cambridge, 1902 — Mexico
 Pardosa litangensis Xu, Zhu & Kim, 2010 — China
 Pardosa littoralis Banks, 1896 — USA, Canada, Cuba
 Pardosa logunovi Kronestedt & Marusik, 2011 — Russia, Mongolia
 Pardosa lombokibia (Strand, 1915) — Lombok
 Pardosa longionycha Yin et al., 1995 — China
 Pardosa longisepta Chen & Song, 2002 — China
 Pardosa longivulva F. O. P.-Cambridge, 1902 — Mexico, Guatemala
 Pardosa lowriei Kronestedt, 1975 — USA, Canada, Alaska
 Pardosa luctinosa Simon, 1876 — Palearctic
 Pardosa luctinosa etsinensis Schenkel, 1963 — China
 Pardosa luctinosa marina (Kolosvary, 1940) — Balkans
 Pardosa ludia (Thorell, 1895) — Myanmar
 Pardosa lugubris (Walckenaer, 1802) — Palearctic
 Pardosa lurida Roewer, 1959 — Tanzania
 Pardosa lusingana Roewer, 1959 — Congo, Namibia
 Pardosa lycosina Purcell, 1903 — South Africa
 Pardosa lycosinella Lawrence, 1927 — Namibia
 Pardosa lyrata (Odenwall, 1901) — Russia, Mongolia
 Pardosa lyrifera Schenkel, 1936 — China, Korea, Japan
 Pardosa mabinii Barrion & Litsinger, 1995 — Philippines
 Pardosa mabweana Roewer, 1959 — Congo
 Pardosa mackenziana (Keyserling, 1877) — USA, Canada, Alaska
 Pardosa maculata Franganillo, 1931 — Cuba
 Pardosa maculatipes (Keyserling, 1887) — Chile
 Pardosa maimaneha Roewer, 1960 — Afghanistan
 Pardosa maisa Hippa & Mannila, 1982 — Finland, Austria, Hungary, Czech Republic, Poland, Russia
 Pardosa manicata Thorell, 1899 — Cameroon
 Pardosa manubriata Simon, 1898 — East, Southern Africa
 Pardosa marchei Simon, 1890 — Mariana Islands
 Pardosa marialuisae Dondale & Redner, 1984 — Mexico to Honduras
 Pardosa martensi Buchar, 1978 — Nepal
 Pardosa martinii (Pavesi, 1883) — Ethiopia
 Pardosa masareyi Mello-Leitao, 1939 — Ecuador
 Pardosa masurae Esyunin & Efimik, 1998 — Russia
 Pardosa mayana Dondale & Redner, 1984 — Mexico to Costa Rica
 Pardosa medialis Banks, 1898 — Mexico
 Pardosa mendicans (Simon, 1882) — Yemen
 Pardosa mercurialis Montgomery, 1904 — USA
 Pardosa messingerae (Strand, 1916) — West, Central, East Africa
 Pardosa metlakatla Emerton, 1917 — USA, Canada, Alaska
 Pardosa mikhailovi Ballarin et al., 2012 — Kazakhstan
 Pardosa milvina (Hentz, 1844) — USA, Canada
 Pardosa minuta Tikader & Malhotra, 1976 — India, Bangladesh
 Pardosa mionebulosa Yin et al., 1997 — China
 Pardosa miquanensis Yin et al., 1995 — China
 Pardosa mira Caporiacco, 1941 — Ethiopia
 Pardosa mixta (Kulczynski, 1887) — Europe, Turkey
 Pardosa modica (Blackwall, 1846) — USA, Canada
 Pardosa moesta Banks, 1892 — USA, Canada, Alaska
 Pardosa mongolica Kulczynski, 1901 — Russia, Tajikistan, Nepal, Mongolia, China
 Pardosa montgomeryi Gertsch, 1934 — USA, Mexico
 Pardosa monticola (Clerck, 1757) — Palearctic
 Pardosa monticola ambigua Simon, 1937 — France
 Pardosa monticola minima Simon, 1876 — France
 Pardosa monticola pseudosaltuaria Simon, 1937 — France
 Pardosa mordagica Tang, Urita & Song, 1995 — China
 Pardosa morosa (L. Koch, 1870) — Europe to Central Asia
 Pardosa mtugensis (Strand, 1908) — North Africa
 Pardosa mubalea Roewer, 1959 — Congo
 Pardosa mukundi Tikader & Malhotra, 1980 — India
 Pardosa mulaiki Gertsch, 1934 — USA, Canada
 Pardosa multidontata Qu, Peng & Yin, 2010 — China
 Pardosa multivaga Simon, 1880 — China
 Pardosa muzafari Ghafoor & Alvi, 2007 — Pakistan
 Pardosa muzkolica Kononenko, 1978 — Tajikistan
 Pardosa mysorensis (Tikader & Mukerji, 1971) — India
 Pardosa naevia (L. Koch, 1875) — Egypt, Ethiopia
 Pardosa naevioides (Strand, 1916) — Namibia
 Pardosa nanica Mello-Leitao, 1941 — Argentina
 Pardosa nanyuensis Yin et al., 1995 — China
 Pardosa narymica Savelyeva, 1972 — Kazakhstan
 Pardosa nebulosa (Thorell, 1872) — Palearctic
 Pardosa nebulosa orientalis (Kroneberg, 1875) — Russia, Georgia
 Pardosa nenilini Marusik, 1995 — Russia, Kazakhstan, Mongolia
 Pardosa nesiotis (Thorell, 1878) — Sumatra, Amboina
 Pardosa nigra (C. L. Koch, 1834) — Palearctic
 Pardosa nigriceps (Thorell, 1856) — Europe
 Pardosa ninigoriensis Mcheidze, 1997 — Georgia
 Pardosa nojimai Tanaka, 1998 — Japan
 Pardosa nordicolens Chamberlin & Ivie, 1947 — Canada, Alaska, Russia
 Pardosa nostrorum Alderweireldt & Jocque, 1992 — Mozambique, South Africa
 Pardosa novitatis (Strand, 1906) — Ethiopia
 Pardosa obscuripes Simon, 1909 — Morocco
 Pardosa observans (O. P.-Cambridge, 1876) — Egypt
 Pardosa occidentalis Simon, 1881 — Portugal, France, Sardinia
 Pardosa odenwalli Sternbergs, 1979 — Russia
 Pardosa oksalai Marusik, Hippa & Koponen, 1996 — Russia
 Pardosa oljunae Lobanova, 1978 — Russia
 Pardosa olympica Tongiorgi, 1966 — Greece
 Pardosa oncka Lawrence, 1927 — Africa
 Pardosa ontariensis Gertsch, 1933 — USA, Canada
 Pardosa orcchaensis Gajbe, 2004 — India
 Pardosa orealis Buchar, 1984 — Nepal
 Pardosa oreophila Simon, 1937 — Central, Southern Europe
 Pardosa oriens (Chamberlin, 1924) — China, Japan, Okinawa
 Pardosa orophila Gertsch, 1933 — USA, Mexico
 Pardosa orthodox Chamberlin, 1924 — USA, Mexico
 Pardosa ourayensis Gertsch, 1933 — USA
 Pardosa ovambica Roewer, 1959 — Namibia
 Pardosa ovtchinnikovi Ballarin et al., 2012 — Central Asia
 Pardosa pacata Fox, 1937 — Hong Kong
 Pardosa pahalanga Barrion & Litsinger, 1995 — Philippines
 Pardosa paleata Alderweireldt & Jocque, 1992 — Libya
 Pardosa paludicola (Clerck, 1757) — Palearctic
 Pardosa palustris (Linnaeus, 1758) — Holarctic
 Pardosa palustris islandica (Strand, 1906) — Iceland
 Pardosa pantinii Ballarin et al., 2012 — Tajikistan
 Pardosa papilionaca Chen & Song, 2003 — China
 Pardosa paracolchica Zyuzin & Logunov, 2000 — Russia, Azerbaijan
 Pardosa paralapponica Schenkel, 1963 — Mongolia, China
 Pardosa paramushirensis (Nakatsudi, 1937) — Kurile Islands, Japan
 Pardosa paratesquorum Schenkel, 1963 — Russia, Mongolia, China
 Pardosa partita Simon, 1885 — India
 Pardosa parvula Banks, 1904 — USA
 Pardosa passibilis (O. P.-Cambridge, 1885) — Kyrgyzstan
 Pardosa patapatensis Barrion & Litsinger, 1995 — Philippines
 Pardosa pauxilla Montgomery, 1904 — USA
 Pardosa pedia Dondale, 2007 — Canada
 Pardosa persica Marusik, Ballarin & Omelko, 2012 — Iran
 Pardosa pertinax von Helversen, 2000 — Greece
 Pardosa petrunkevitchi Gertsch, 1934 — Mexico
 Pardosa pexa Hickman, 1944 — South Australia
 Pardosa pinangensis (Thorell, 1890) — Malaysia, Sumatra
 Pardosa pirkuliensis Zyuzin & Logunov, 2000 — Azerbaijan
 Pardosa plagula F. O. P.-Cambridge, 1902 — Mexico
 Pardosa plumipedata (Roewer, 1951) — Argentina
 Pardosa plumipes (Thorell, 1875) — Palearctic
 Pardosa podhorskii (Kulczynski, 1907) — Canada, Alaska, Russia
 Pardosa poecila (Herman, 1879) — Hungary
 Pardosa pontica (Thorell, 1875) — Eastern Europe to Central Asia
 Pardosa portoricensis Banks, 1901 — Puerto Rico, Virgin Islands, Antigua
 Pardosa potamophila Lawrence, 1927 — Namibia
 Pardosa praepes Simon, 1886 — Senegal
 Pardosa prativaga (L. Koch, 1870) — Europe, Russia
 Pardosa prativaga scoparia Simon, 1937 — France
 Pardosa procurva Yu & Song, 1988 — China, Taiwan
 Pardosa profuga (Herman, 1879) — Hungary
 Pardosa prolifica F. O. P.-Cambridge, 1902 — Mexico to Panama
 Pardosa proxima (C. L. Koch, 1847) — Palearctic, Canary Islands, Azores
 Pardosa proxima annulatoides (Strand, 1915) — Israel
 Pardosa proxima antoni (Strand, 1915) — Israel
 Pardosa proxima poetica Simon, 1876 — Portugal, Spain, France
 Pardosa psammodes (Thorell, 1887) — Myanmar
 Pardosa pseudoannulata (Bösenberg & Strand, 1906) — Pakistan to Japan, Philippines, Java
 Pardosa pseudochapini Peng, 2011 — China
 Pardosa pseudokaragonis (Strand, 1913) — Central Africa
 Pardosa pseudolapponica Marusik, 1995 — Kazakhstan
 Pardosa pseudomixta Marusik & Fritzén, 2009 — China
 Pardosa pseudostrigillata Tongiorgi, 1966 — Austria, Italy, Slovenia
 Pardosa pseudotorrentum Miller & Buchar, 1972 — Afghanistan
 Pardosa pullata (Clerck, 1757) — Europe, Russia, Central Asia
 Pardosa pullata jugorum Simon, 1937 — France
 Pardosa pumilio Roewer, 1959 — Ethiopia
 Pardosa pusiola (Thorell, 1891) — India to China and Java
 Pardosa pyrenaica Kronestedt, 2007 — France, Andorra, Spain
 Pardosa qingzangensis Hu, 2001 — China
 Pardosa qinhaiensis Yin et al., 1995 — China
 Pardosa qionghuai Yin et al., 1995 — China
 Pardosa rabulana (Thorell, 1890) — Malaysia, Sumatra, Java
 Pardosa rainieriana Lowrie & Dondale, 1981 — USA, Canada
 Pardosa ramulosa (McCook, 1894) — USA, Mexico
 Pardosa ranjani Gajbe, 2004 — India
 Pardosa rara (Keyserling, 1891) — Brazil
 Pardosa rascheri (Dahl, 1908) — Bismarck Archipel
 Pardosa rhenockensis (Tikader, 1970) — India
 Pardosa rhombisepta Roewer, 1960 — Afghanistan
 Pardosa riparia (C. L. Koch, 1833) — Palearctic
 Pardosa riveti Berland, 1913 — Ecuador
 Pardosa roeweri Schenkel, 1963 — China
 Pardosa roscai (Roewer, 1951) — Bulgaria, Romania, Turkey
 Pardosa royi Biswas & Raychaudhuri, 2003 — Bangladesh
 Pardosa ruanda (Strand, 1913) — Rwanda
 Pardosa rudis Yin et al., 1995 — China
 Pardosa rugegensis (Strand, 1913) — Central Africa
 Pardosa sagei Gertsch & Wallace, 1937 — Panama
 Pardosa saltans Töpfer-Hofmann, 2000 — Europe, Turkey
 Pardosa saltonia Dondale & Redner, 1984 — USA, Mexico
 Pardosa saltuaria (L. Koch, 1870) — Central Europe to Kazakhstan
 Pardosa saltuarides (Strand, 1908) — Ethiopia
 Pardosa sangzhiensis Yin et al., 1995 — China
 Pardosa sanmenensis Yu & Song, 1988 — China
 Pardosa santamaria Barrion & Litsinger, 1995 — Philippines
 Pardosa saturatior Simon, 1937 — Central Europe
 Pardosa saxatilis (Hentz, 1844) — USA, Canada
 Pardosa schenkeli Lessert, 1904 — Palearctic
 Pardosa schreineri Purcell, 1903 — South Africa
 Pardosa schubotzi (Strand, 1913) — Central, East Africa
 Pardosa selengensis (Odenwall, 1901) — Russia, Mongolia
 Pardosa semicana Simon, 1885 — Sri Lanka, Malaysia, China
 Pardosa septentrionalis (Westring, 1861) — Northern Palearctic
 Pardosa serena (L. Koch, 1875) — Egypt
 Pardosa shuangjiangensis Yin et al., 1997 — China
 Pardosa shugangensis Yin, Bao & Peng, 1997 — China
 Pardosa shyamae (Tikader, 1970) — India, Bangladesh, China
 Pardosa sibiniformis Tang, Urita & Song, 1995 — China
 Pardosa sichuanensis Yu & Song, 1991 — China
 Pardosa sierra Banks, 1898 — Mexico
 Pardosa silvarum Hu, 2001 — China
 Pardosa sinensis Yin et al., 1995 — China
 Pardosa sinistra (Thorell, 1877) — USA, Canada
 Pardosa soccata Yu & Song, 1988 — China
 Pardosa socorroensis Jimenez, 1991 — Mexico
 Pardosa sodalis Holm, 1970 — Canada, Alaska, Russia
 Pardosa songosa Tikader & Malhotra, 1976 — India, Bangladesh, China
 Pardosa sordidata (Thorell, 1875) — Palearctic
 Pardosa sordidecolorata (Strand, 1906) — Ethiopia
 Pardosa sowerbyi Hogg, 1912 — China
 Pardosa sphagnicola (Dahl, 1908) — Europe, Russia
 Pardosa stellata (O. P.-Cambridge, 1885) — Central Asia
 Pardosa sternalis (Thorell, 1877) — North America
 Pardosa steva Lowrie & Gertsch, 1955 — North America
 Pardosa straeleni Roewer, 1959 — Congo
 Pardosa strandembriki Caporiacco, 1949 — Ethiopia
 Pardosa strena Yu & Song, 1988 — China
 Pardosa strigata Yu & Song, 1988 — China
 Pardosa strix (Holmberg, 1876) — Argentina
 Pardosa subalpina Schenkel, 1918 — Switzerland
 Pardosa subanchoroides Wang & Song, 1993 — China
 Pardosa subproximella (Strand, 1906) — Ethiopia
 Pardosa subsordidatula (Strand, 1915) — Israel
 Pardosa suchismitae Majumder, 2004 — India
 Pardosa sumatrana (Thorell, 1890) — India, China to Philippines, Sulawesi
 Pardosa sura Chamberlin & Ivie, 1941 — USA, Mexico
 Pardosa sutherlandi (Gravely, 1924) — India, Nepal
 Pardosa suwai Tanaka, 1985 — Russia, China, Japan
 Pardosa svatoni Marusik, Nadolny & Omelko, 2013 — Kazakhstan
 Pardosa taczanowskii (Thorell, 1875) — Russia, Mongolia, China
 Pardosa takahashii (Saito, 1936) — China, Taiwan, Japan, Okinawa
 Pardosa tangana Roewer, 1959 — Tanzania
 Pardosa tappaensis Gajbe, 2004 — India
 Pardosa tasevi Buchar, 1968 — Eastern Europe, Russia, Turkey, Azerbaijan
 Pardosa tatarica (Thorell, 1875) — Palearctic
 Pardosa tatarica ligurica Simon, 1937 — Italy
 Pardosa tatarica saturiator Caporiacco, 1948 — Greece
 Pardosa tenera Thorell, 1899 — Cameroon
 Pardosa tenuipes L. Koch, 1882 — Balearic Islands
 Pardosa tesquorum (Odenwall, 1901) — Russia, Mongolia, China, USA, Canada, Alaska
 Pardosa tesquorumoides Song & Yu, 1990 — China
 Pardosa tetonensis Gertsch, 1933 — USA
 Pardosa thalassia (Thorell, 1891) — Nicobar Islands
 Pardosa thompsoni Alderweireldt & Jocque, 1992 — East Africa
 Pardosa thorelli (Collett, 1876) — Norway
 Pardosa tikaderi Arora & Monga, 1994 — India
 Pardosa timidula (Roewer, 1951) — Yemen, Sri Lanka, Pakistan
 Pardosa torrentum Simon, 1876 — Europe, Georgia
 Pardosa torrentum integra Denis, 1950 — France
 Pardosa trailli (O. P.-Cambridge, 1873) — Britain, Scandinavia
 Pardosa tricuspidata Tullgren, 1905 — Argentina
 Pardosa tridentis Caporiacco, 1935 — India, Nepal, Kashmir
 Pardosa trifoveata (Strand, 1907) — China
 Pardosa tristicella (Roewer, 1951) — Colombia
 Pardosa tristiculella (Roewer, 1951) — Myanmar
 Pardosa trottai Ballarin et al., 2012 — Kyrgyzstan
 Pardosa tschekiangiensis Schenkel, 1963 — China
 Pardosa tumida Barnes, 1959 — Mexico
 Pardosa tuoba Chamberlin, 1919 — USA
 Pardosa turkestanica (Roewer, 1951) — Russia, Central Asia
 Pardosa tyshchenkoi Zyuzin & Marusik, 1989 — Russia
 Pardosa uiensis Esyunin, 1996 — Russia
 Pardosa uintana Gertsch, 1933 — USA, Canada, Alaska
 Pardosa umtalica Purcell, 1903 — Southern Africa
 Pardosa uncata (Thorell, 1877) — USA
 Pardosa uncifera Schenkel, 1963 — Russia, China, Korea
 Pardosa unciferodies Qu, Peng & Yin, 2010 — China
 Pardosa unguifera F. O. P.-Cambridge, 1902 — Mexico, Guatemala
 Pardosa upembensis (Roewer, 1959) — Congo
 Pardosa utahensis Chamberlin, 1919 — USA
 Pardosa vadosa Barnes, 1959 — USA, Mexico
 Pardosa vagula (Thorell, 1890) — Sumatra, Mentawai Islands, Simeulue, Java
 Pardosa valens Barnes, 1959 — USA, Mexico
 Pardosa valida Banks, 1893 — Sierra Leone, Congo
 Pardosa vancouveri Emerton, 1917 — USA, Canada
 Pardosa vatovae Caporiacco, 1940 — Ethiopia
 Pardosa verticillifer (Strand, 1906) — Ethiopia
 Pardosa vindex (O. P.-Cambridge, 1885) — Yarkand
 Pardosa vindicata (O. P.-Cambridge, 1885) — Yarkand, Karakorum
 Pardosa vinsoni (Roewer, 1951) — Madagascar
 Pardosa virgata Kulczynski, 1901 — Mongolia
 Pardosa vittata (Keyserling, 1863) — Europe to Georgia
 Pardosa vlijmi den Hollander & Dijkstra, 1974 — France
 Pardosa vogelae Kronestedt, 1993 — USA
 Pardosa v-signata Soares & Camargo, 1948 — Brazil
 Pardosa vulvitecta Schenkel, 1936 — China
 Pardosa wagleri (Hahn, 1822) — Palearctic
 Pardosa wagleri atra (Giebel, 1869) — Europe
 Pardosa warayensis Barrion & Litsinger, 1995 — Philippines
 Pardosa wasatchensis Gertsch, 1933 — USA
 Pardosa wuyiensis Yu & Song, 1988 — China
 Pardosa wyuta Gertsch, 1934 — USA, Canada
 Pardosa xerampelina (Keyserling, 1877) — USA, Canada, Alaska
 Pardosa xerophila Vogel, 1964 — USA, Mexico
 Pardosa xinjiangensis Hu & Wu, 1989 — China
 Pardosa yadongensis Hu & Li, 1987 — China
 Pardosa yaginumai Tanaka, 1977 — Japan
 Pardosa yamanoi Tanaka & Suwa, 1986 — Japan
 Pardosa yavapa Chamberlin, 1925 — USA
 Pardosa yongduensis Kim & Chae, 2012 — Korea
 Pardosa zhangi Song & Haupt, 1995 — China
 Pardosa zhui Yu & Song, 1988 — China
 Pardosa zionis Chamberlin & Ivie, 1942 — USA, Mexico
 Pardosa zonsteini Ballarin et al., 2012 — Central Asia
 Pardosa zorimorpha (Strand, 1907) — Madagascar
 Pardosa zuojiani Song & Haupt, 1995 — China
 Pardosa zyuzini Kronestedt & Marusik, 2011 — Russia, Mongolia

Pardosella
Pardosella Caporiacco, 1939
 Pardosella delesserti Caporiacco, 1939 — Ethiopia
 Pardosella maculata Caporiacco, 1941 — Ethiopia
 Pardosella massaiensis Roewer, 1959 — Tanzania
 Pardosella tabora Roewer, 1959 — Tanzania
 Pardosella zavattarii Caporiacco, 1939 — Ethiopia

Passiena
Passiena Thorell, 1890
 Passiena albipalpis Roewer, 1959 — Cameroon
 Passiena auberti (Simon, 1898) — South Africa
 Passiena spinicrus Thorell, 1890 — Malaysia, Borneo
 Passiena torbjoerni Lehtinen, 2005 — Thailand

Pavocosa
Pavocosa Roewer, 1960
 Pavocosa feisica (Strand, 1915) — Caroline Islands
 Pavocosa gallopavo (Mello-Leitao, 1941) — Argentina
 Pavocosa herteli (Mello-Leitao, 1947) — Brazil
 Pavocosa langei (Mello-Leitao, 1947) — Brazil
 Pavocosa siamensis (Giebel, 1863) — Thailand

Phonophilus
Phonophilus Ehrenberg, 1831
 Phonophilus portentosus Ehrenberg, 1831 — Libya

Pirata
Pirata Sundevall, 1833
 Pirata abalosi (Mello-Leitao, 1942) — Argentina
 Pirata affinis Roewer, 1960 — Congo
 Pirata africana (Roewer, 1960) — Namibia
 Pirata alachuus Gertsch & Wallace, 1935 — USA
 Pirata albicomaculatus Franganillo, 1913 — Spain
 Pirata allapahae Gertsch, 1940 — USA
 Pirata apalacheus Gertsch, 1940 — USA
 Pirata aspirans Chamberlin, 1904 — USA, Canada
 Pirata brevipes (Banks, 1893) — Congo
 Pirata browni Gertsch & Davis, 1940 — Mexico
 Pirata bryantae Kurata, 1944 — Canada, Alaska
 Pirata cereipes (L. Koch, 1878) — Central Asia
 Pirata chamberlini (Lessert, 1927) — Congo, East Africa
 Pirata coreanus Paik, 1991 — Korea
 Pirata davisi Wallace & Exline, 1978 — USA, Mexico
 Pirata digitatus Tso & Chen, 2004 — Taiwan
 Pirata felix O. P.-Cambridge, 1898 — Mexico
 Pirata hiteorum Wallace & Exline, 1978 — USA
 Pirata indigenus Wallace & Exline, 1978 — USA
 Pirata iviei Wallace & Exline, 1978 — USA
 Pirata mayaca Gertsch, 1940 — USA, Bahama Islands, Cuba
 Pirata molensis (Strand, 1908) — Ethiopia
 Pirata montanoides Banks, 1892 — USA
 Pirata montanus Emerton, 1885 — USA, Canada, Russia
 Pirata nanatus Gertsch, 1940 — USA
 Pirata niokolona Roewer, 1961 — Senegal
 Pirata pagicola Chamberlin, 1925 — Mexico to Panama
 Pirata pallipes (Blackwall, 1857) — Algeria
 Pirata piratellus (Strand, 1907) — Japan
 Pirata piraticus (Clerck, 1757) — Holarctic
 Pirata piratimorphus (Strand, 1908) — USA
 Pirata piscatorius (Clerck, 1757) — Palearctic
 Pirata praedo Kulczynski, 1885 — Russia, Japan, USA, Canada
 Pirata proximus O. P.-Cambridge, 1876 — Egypt
 Pirata rubicundicoloratus (Strand, 1906) — Algeria
 Pirata sagitta (Mello-Leitao, 1941) — Argentina
 Pirata sedentarius Montgomery, 1904 — North America, Greater Antilles
 Pirata seminolus Gertsch & Wallace, 1935 — USA
 Pirata soukupi (Mello-Leitao, 1942) — Peru
 Pirata spatulatus Chai, 1985 — China
 Pirata spiniger (Simon, 1898) — USA
 Pirata subannulipes (Strand, 1906) — Ethiopia
 Pirata subniger Franganillo, 1913 — Spain
 Pirata subpiraticus (Bösenberg & Strand, 1906) — Russia, Korea, China, Japan, Java, Philippines
 Pirata suwaneus Gertsch, 1940 — USA, Bahama Islands
 Pirata sylvanus Chamberlin & Ivie, 1944 — USA
 Pirata taurirtensis (Schenkel, 1937) — Morocco
 Pirata tenuitarsis Simon, 1876 — Europe to Mongolia
 Pirata timidus (Lucas, 1846) — Algeria
 Pirata trepidus Roewer, 1960 — Namibia
 Pirata triens Wallace & Exline, 1978 — USA
 Pirata turrialbicus Wallace & Exline, 1978 — Costa Rica, Panama, Cuba
 Pirata uliginosus (Thorell, 1856) — Europe, Russia
 Pirata velox Keyserling, 1891 — Brazil
 Pirata veracruzae Gertsch & Davis, 1940 — Mexico
 Pirata welakae Wallace & Exline, 1978 — USA
 Pirata werneri (Roewer, 1960) — Morocco
 Pirata zavattarii (Caporiacco, 1941) — Ethiopia

Piratula
Piratula Roewer, 1960
 Piratula borea (Tanaka, 1974) — Russia, China, Japan
 Piratula canadensis (Dondale & Redner, 1981) — Russia, Canada
 Piratula cantralli (Wallace & Exline, 1978) — USA, Canada
 Piratula clercki (Bösenberg & Strand, 1906) — China, Korea, Taiwan, Japan
 Piratula denticulata (Liu, 1987) — Russia, China, Taiwan
 Piratula gigantea (Gertsch, 1934) — USA
 Piratula hiroshii (Tanaka, 1986) — Japan
 Piratula hokkaidensis (Tanaka, 2003) — Japan
 Piratula hurkai (Buchar, 1966) — Ukraine, Russia, Georgia, Abkhazia
 Piratula hygrophila (Thorell, 1872) — Palearctic
 Piratula insularis (Emerton, 1885) — Holarctic
 Piratula iriomotensis (Tanaka, 1989) — Ryukyu Islands
 Piratula knorri (Scopoli, 1763) — Palearctic
 Piratula latitans (Blackwall, 1841) — Europe to Azerbaijan
 Piratula logunovi Omelko, Marusik & Koponen, 2011 — Russia
 Piratula longjiangensis (Yan et al., 1997) — China
 Piratula meridionalis (Tanaka, 1974) — China, Korea, Japan
 Piratula minuta (Emerton, 1885) — North America
 Piratula montigena (Liu, 1987) — China
 Piratula piratoides (Bösenberg & Strand, 1906) — Russia, Korea, China, Japan
 Piratula procurva (Bösenberg & Strand, 1906) — China, Korea, Japan
 Piratula serrulata (Song & Wang, 1984) — Russia, China
 Piratula tanakai (Brignoli, 1983) — Russia, Korea, Japan
 Piratula tenuisetacea (Chai, 1987) — China
 Piratula yaginumai (Tanaka, 1974) — Russia, China, Korea, Japan
 Piratula yesoensis (Tanaka, 1985) — Japan

Proevippa
Proevippa Purcell, 1903
 Proevippa albiventris (Simon, 1898) — Namibia, South Africa
 Proevippa biampliata (Purcell, 1903) — South Africa
 Proevippa bruneipes (Purcell, 1903) — South Africa
 Proevippa dregei (Purcell, 1903) — South Africa
 Proevippa eberlanzi (Roewer, 1959) — Namibia
 Proevippa fascicularis (Purcell, 1903) — South Africa
 Proevippa hirsuta (Russell-Smith, 1981) — South Africa
 Proevippa lightfooti Purcell, 1903 — South Africa
 Proevippa schreineri (Purcell, 1903) — South Africa
 Proevippa unicolor (Roewer, 1960) — Congo
 Proevippa wanlessi (Russell-Smith, 1981) — South Africa

Prolycosides
Prolycosides Mello-Leitao, 1942
 Prolycosides amblygyna (Mello-Leitao, 1942) — Argentina

Pseudevippa
Pseudevippa Simon, 1910
 Pseudevippa cana Simon, 1910 — Namibia

Pterartoria
Pterartoria Purcell, 1903
 Pterartoria arbuscula (Purcell, 1903) — South Africa
 Pterartoria fissivittata Purcell, 1903 — South Africa
 Pterartoria flavolimbata Purcell, 1903 — South Africa
 Pterartoria masarangi (Merian, 1911) — Sulawesi
 Pterartoria polysticta Purcell, 1903 — South Africa

Pterartoriola
Pterartoriola Roewer, 1959
 Pterartoriola caldaria (Purcell, 1903) — South Africa
 Pterartoriola lativittata (Purcell, 1903) — South Africa
 Pterartoriola lompobattangi (Merian, 1911) — Sulawesi
 Pterartoriola sagae (Purcell, 1903) — South Africa
 Pterartoriola subcrucifera (Purcell, 1903) — South Africa

Pyrenecosa
Pyrenecosa Marusik, Azarkina & Koponen, 2004
 Pyrenecosa pyrenaea (Simon, 1876) — France
 Pyrenecosa rupicola (Dufour, 1821) — Spain, France, Switzerland
 Pyrenecosa spinosa (Denis, 1938) — Andorra

Rabidosa
Rabidosa Roewer, 1960
 Rabidosa carrana (Bryant, 1934) — USA
 Rabidosa hentzi (Banks, 1904) — USA
 Rabidosa punctulata (Hentz, 1844) — USA
 Rabidosa rabida (Walckenaer, 1837) — North America
 Rabidosa santrita (Chamberlin & Ivie, 1942) — USA

Satta
Satta Lehtinen & Hippa, 1979
 Satta cannibalorum Lehtinen & Hippa, 1979 — New Guinea

Schizocosa
Schizocosa Chamberlin, 1904
 Schizocosa altamontis (Chamberlin, 1916) — Peru
 Schizocosa arua (Strand, 1911) — Aru Islands
 Schizocosa astuta (Roewer, 1959) — Tanzania
 Schizocosa aulonia Dondale, 1969 — USA
 Schizocosa avida (Walckenaer, 1837) — North America
 Schizocosa bilineata (Emerton, 1885) — USA, Canada
 Schizocosa cecili (Pocock, 1901) — Zimbabwe
 Schizocosa ceratiola (Gertsch & Wallace, 1935) — USA
 Schizocosa cespitum Dondale & Redner, 1978 — Canada
 Schizocosa chelifasciata (Mello-Leitao, 1943) — Brazil
 Schizocosa chiricahua Dondale & Redner, 1978 — USA
 Schizocosa communis (Emerton, 1885) — USA, Canada
 Schizocosa concolor (Caporiacco, 1935) — Karakorum
 Schizocosa conspicua (Roewer, 1959) — Rwanda
 Schizocosa cotabatoana Barrion & Litsinger, 1995 — Philippines
 Schizocosa crassipalpata Roewer, 1951 — USA, Canada
 Schizocosa crassipes (Walckenaer, 1837) — USA
 Schizocosa darlingi (Pocock, 1898) — Southern Africa
 Schizocosa duplex Chamberlin, 1925 — USA
 Schizocosa ehni (Lessert, 1933) — Angola
 Schizocosa floridana Bryant, 1934 — USA
 Schizocosa fragilis (Thorell, 1890) — Sumatra
 Schizocosa hebes (O. P.-Cambridge, 1885) — Yarkand
 Schizocosa hewitti (Lessert, 1915) — East Africa
 Schizocosa humilis (Banks, 1892) — USA, Canada
 Schizocosa incerta (Bryant, 1934) — USA
 Schizocosa interjecta (Roewer, 1959) — Tanzania
 Schizocosa malitiosa (Tullgren, 1905) — Bolivia, Argentina, Uruguay
 Schizocosa maxima Dondale & Redner, 1978 — USA
 Schizocosa mccooki (Montgomery, 1904) — North America
 Schizocosa mimula (Gertsch, 1934) — USA, Mexico
 Schizocosa minahassae (Merian, 1911) — Sulawesi
 Schizocosa minnesotensis (Gertsch, 1934) — USA, Canada
 Schizocosa minor (Lessert, 1926) — East Africa
 Schizocosa obscoena (Rainbow, 1899) — New Hebrides
 Schizocosa ocreata (Hentz, 1844) — North America
 Schizocosa parricida (Karsch, 1881) — China
 Schizocosa perplexa Bryant, 1936 — USA
 Schizocosa pilipes (Karsch, 1879) — West, Central Africa
 Schizocosa proletaria (Tullgren, 1905) — Bolivia, Argentina
 Schizocosa puebla Chamberlin, 1925 — USA
 Schizocosa retrorsa (Banks, 1911) — USA, Mexico
 Schizocosa rovneri Uetz & Dondale, 1979 — USA
 Schizocosa rubiginea (O. P.-Cambridge, 1885) — Yarkand
 Schizocosa salara (Roewer, 1960) — Afghanistan
 Schizocosa salsa Barnes, 1953 — USA
 Schizocosa saltatrix (Hentz, 1844) — North America
 Schizocosa segregata Gertsch & Wallace, 1937 — USA
 Schizocosa semiargentea (Simon, 1898) — Peru
 Schizocosa serranoi (Mello-Leitao, 1941) — Brazil, Argentina
 Schizocosa stridulans Stratton, 1984 — USA
 Schizocosa subpersonata (Simon, 1910) — Namibia
 Schizocosa tamae (Gertsch & Davis, 1940) — Mexico
 Schizocosa tenera (Karsch, 1879) — West, Central Africa
 Schizocosa tristani (Banks, 1909) — Costa Rica, Panama
 Schizocosa uetzi Stratton, 1997 — USA
 Schizocosa venusta (Roewer, 1959) — Tanzania
 Schizocosa vulpecula (L. Koch, 1865) — Wallis Islands

Shapna
Shapna Hippa & Lehtinen, 1983
 Shapna pluvialis Hippa & Lehtinen, 1983 — India

Sibirocosa
Sibirocosa Marusik, Azarkina & Koponen, 2004
 Sibirocosa kolymensis Marusik, Azarkina & Koponen, 2004 — Russia
 Sibirocosa koponeni Omelko & Marusik, 2013 — Russia
 Sibirocosa manchurica Marusik, Azarkina & Koponen, 2004 — Russia
 Sibirocosa nadolnyi Omelko & Marusik, 2013 — Russia
 Sibirocosa sibirica (Kulczynski, 1908) — Russia
 Sibirocosa subsolana (Kulczynski, 1907) — Russia
 Sibirocosa trilikauskasi Omelko & Marusik, 2013 — Russia

Sosippus
Sosippus Simon, 1888
 Sosippus agalenoides Banks, 1909 — Mexico to Costa Rica
 Sosippus californicus Simon, 1898 — USA, Mexico
 Sosippus floridanus Simon, 1898 — USA
 Sosippus janus Brady, 1972 — USA
 Sosippus mexicanus Simon, 1888 — Mexico, Guatemala
 Sosippus michoacanus Brady, 1962 — Mexico
 Sosippus mimus Chamberlin, 1924 — USA
 Sosippus placidus Brady, 1972 — USA
 Sosippus plutonus Brady, 1962 — Mexico
 Sosippus texanus Brady, 1962 — USA

Syroloma
Syroloma Simon, 1900
 Syroloma major Simon, 1900 — Hawaii
 Syroloma minor Simon, 1900 — Hawaii

Tapetosa
Tapetosa Framenau et al., 2009
 Tapetosa darwini Framenau et al., 2009 — Western Australia

Tasmanicosa
Tasmanicosa Roewer, 1959
 Tasmanicosa tasmanica (Hogg, 1905) — Tasmania

Tetralycosa
Tetralycosa Roewer, 1960
 Tetralycosa alteripa (McKay, 1976) — Western Australia
 Tetralycosa arabanae Framenau, Gotch & Austin, 2006 — South Australia
 Tetralycosa eyrei (Hickman, 1944) — South Australia, Victoria
 Tetralycosa oraria (L. Koch, 1876) — Southern Australia, Tasmania

Tigrosa
Tigrosa Brady, 2012
 Tigrosa annexa (Chamberlin & Ivie, 1944) — USA
 Tigrosa aspersa (Hentz, 1844) — USA, Canada
 Tigrosa georgicola (Walckenaer, 1837) — USA
 Tigrosa grandis (Banks, 1894) — USA
 Tigrosa helluo (Walckenaer, 1837) — USA, Canada

Trabea
Trabea Simon, 1876
 Trabea bipunctata (Roewer, 1959) — Congo, Rwanda, Malawi, Ethiopia
 Trabea cazorla Snazell, 1983 — Spain, Morocco, Algeria
 Trabea heteroculata Strand, 1913 — Rwanda, Tanzania, Kenya
 Trabea natalensis Russell-Smith, 1982 — South Africa
 Trabea nigriceps Purcell, 1903 — South Africa
 Trabea nigristernis Alderweireldt, 1999 — Malawi
 Trabea ornatipalpis Russell-Smith, 1982 — South Africa
 Trabea paradoxa Simon, 1876 — Southern Europe, Turkey
 Trabea purcelli Roewer, 1951 — South Africa
 Trabea rubriceps Lawrence, 1952 — South Africa
 Trabea setula Alderweireldt, 1999 — Malawi
 Trabea unicolor Purcell, 1903 — South Africa
 Trabea varia Purcell, 1903 — South Africa

Trabeops
Trabeops Roewer, 1959
 Trabeops aurantiacus (Emerton, 1885) — USA, Canada

Trebacosa
Trebacosa Dondale & Redner, 1981
 Trebacosa europaea Szinetar & Kancsal, 2007 (syn. Trebacosa brunhesi) — Hungary
 Trebacosa marxi (Stone, 1890) — USA, Canada

Tricassa
Tricassa Simon, 1910
 Tricassa deserticola Simon, 1910 — Namibia, South Africa
 Tricassa madagascariensis Jocque & Alderweireldt, 2001 — Madagascar

Trochosa
Trochosa C. L. Koch, 1847
 Trochosa abdita (Gertsch, 1934) — USA
 Trochosa adjacens O. P.-Cambridge, 1885 — Yarkand
 Trochosa albifrons (Roewer, 1960) — Congo
 Trochosa albipilosa (Roewer, 1960) — South Africa
 Trochosa albomarginata (Roewer, 1960) — Zimbabwe
 Trochosa albopunctata (Mello-Leitao, 1941) — Argentina
 Trochosa altera (Roewer, 1955) — Iran
 Trochosa alviolai Barrion & Litsinger, 1995 — Philippines
 Trochosa annulipes L. Koch, 1875 — Libya, Egypt, Ethiopia
 Trochosa aperta (Roewer, 1960) — Namibia
 Trochosa aquatica Tanaka, 1985 — China, Japan
 Trochosa arctosina Caporiacco, 1947 — Venezuela, Guyana
 Trochosa bannaensis Yin & Chen, 1995 — China
 Trochosa beltran (Mello-Leitao, 1942) — Argentina
 Trochosa bukobae (Strand, 1916) — East Africa
 Trochosa cachetiensis Mcheidze, 1997 — Georgia
 Trochosa canapii Barrion & Litsinger, 1995 — Philippines
 Trochosa charmina (Strand, 1916) — Cameroon
 Trochosa corporaali (Reimoser, 1935) — China
 Trochosa dentichelis Buchar, 1997 — Bhutan
 Trochosa entebbensis (Lessert, 1915) — Central, East Africa
 Trochosa fabella (Karsch, 1879) — West, Central Africa
 Trochosa fageli Roewer, 1960 — Congo
 Trochosa garamantica (Caporiacco, 1936) — Libya
 Trochosa gentilis (Roewer, 1960) — Cameroon
 Trochosa glarea McKay, 1979 — Queensland
 Trochosa gravelyi Buchar, 1976 — Nepal
 Trochosa guatemala Chamberlin & Ivie, 1942 — Guatemala
 Trochosa gunturensis Patel & Reddy, 1993 — India
 Trochosa himalayensis Tikader & Malhotra, 1980 — India
 Trochosa hirtipes Ponomarev, 2009 — Russia
 Trochosa hispanica Simon, 1870 — Mediterranean to Central Asia
 Trochosa hoggi (Lessert, 1926) — East Africa
 Trochosa hungarica Herman, 1879 — Hungary
 Trochosa immaculata Savelyeva, 1972 — Kazakhstan
 Trochosa impercussa Roewer, 1955 — Iran
 Trochosa infausta (Mello-Leitao, 1941) — Argentina
 Trochosa insignis O. P.-Cambridge, 1898 — Costa Rica
 Trochosa intermedia (Roewer, 1960) — Zimbabwe
 Trochosa iviei (Gertsch & Wallace, 1937) — Mexico
 Trochosa joshidana (Kishida, 1909) — Japan
 Trochosa kaieteurensis (Gertsch & Wallace, 1937) — Guyana
 Trochosa kalukanai (Simon, 1900) — Hawaii
 Trochosa liberiana (Roewer, 1960) — Liberia
 Trochosa longa Qu, Peng & Yin, 2010 — China
 Trochosa lucasi (Roewer, 1951) — Canary Islands
 Trochosa lugubris O. P.-Cambridge, 1885 — Tajikistan
 Trochosa magdalenensis (Strand, 1914) — Colombia
 Trochosa magna (Roewer, 1960) — Liberia
 Trochosa masumbica (Strand, 1916) — East Africa
 Trochosa melloi Roewer, 1951 — Brazil
 Trochosa menglaensis Yin, Bao & Wang, 1995 — China
 Trochosa minima (Roewer, 1960) — Congo, Kenya
 Trochosa moluccensis Thorell, 1878 — Amboina
 Trochosa mossambicus (Roewer, 1960) — Mozambique
 Trochosa mundamea Roewer, 1960 — Cameroon, Sierra Leone
 Trochosa niveopilosa (Mello-Leitao, 1938) — Argentina
 Trochosa obscura (Roewer, 1960) — Rwanda
 Trochosa ochracea (L. Koch, 1856) — Spain
 Trochosa papakula (Strand, 1911) — Moluccas, New Guinea
 Trochosa paranaensis (Mello-Leitao, 1937) — Brazil
 Trochosa pardaloides (Mello-Leitao, 1937) — Brazil
 Trochosa parviguttata (Strand, 1906) — Ethiopia
 Trochosa pelengena (Roewer, 1960) — Congo
 Trochosa persica (Roewer, 1955) — Iran
 Trochosa phyllis (Hogg, 1905) — South Australia
 Trochosa praetecta L. Koch, 1875 — Ethiopia
 Trochosa presumptuosa (Holmberg, 1876) — Argentina
 Trochosa propinqua O. P.-Cambridge, 1885 — Yarkand
 Trochosa pseudofurva (Strand, 1906) — Cameroon
 Trochosa punctipes (Gravely, 1924) — India
 Trochosa quinquefasciata Roewer, 1960 — Tanzania
 Trochosa reichardtiana (Strand, 1916) — Hispaniola
 Trochosa reimoseri Bristowe, 1931 — Krakatau
 Trochosa robusta (Simon, 1876) — Palearctic
 Trochosa ruandanica (Roewer, 1960) — Rwanda
 Trochosa ruricola (De Geer, 1778) — Holarctic, Bermuda
 Trochosa ruricoloides Schenkel, 1963 — China, Taiwan
 Trochosa sanlorenziana (Petrunkevitch, 1925) — Panama
 Trochosa semoni Simon, 1896 — Java
 Trochosa sepulchralis (Montgomery, 1902) — USA
 Trochosa sericea (Simon, 1898) — Brazil
 Trochosa spinipalpis (F. O. P.-Cambridge, 1895) — Palearctic
 Trochosa suiningensis Peng et al., 1997 — China
 Trochosa tangerana (Roewer, 1960) — Morocco
 Trochosa tenebrosa Keyserling, 1877 — Colombia
 Trochosa tenella Keyserling, 1877 — Colombia
 Trochosa tenuis (Roewer, 1960) — Ethiopia
 Trochosa terricola Thorell, 1856 — Holarctic
 Trochosa unmunsanensis Paik, 1994 — Korea
 Trochosa ursina (Schenkel, 1936) — China
 Trochosa vulvella (Strand, 1907) — Japan
 Trochosa werneri (Roewer, 1960) — Algeria
 Trochosa wuchangensis (Schenkel, 1963) — China
 Trochosa wundurra McKay, 1979 — Western Australia

Trochosippa
Trochosippa Roewer, 1960
 Trochosippa eberlanzi Roewer, 1960 — Namibia
 Trochosippa eugeni (Roewer, 1951) — Namibia
 Trochosippa kaswabilengae Roewer, 1960 — Congo
 Trochosippa malayana (Doleschall, 1859) — Amboina
 Trochosippa meruensis (Lessert, 1926) — East Africa
 Trochosippa modesta Roewer, 1960 — South Africa
 Trochosippa nigerrima Roewer, 1960 — South Africa
 Trochosippa obscura (Mello-Leitao, 1943) — Argentina
 Trochosippa pardosella (Strand, 1906) — Ethiopia

Tuberculosa
Tuberculosa Framenau & Yoo, 2006
 Tuberculosa austini Framenau & Yoo, 2006 — Queensland
 Tuberculosa harveyi Framenau & Yoo, 2006 — Northern Territory
 Tuberculosa hoggi (Framenau & Vink, 2001) — Queensland
 Tuberculosa monteithi Framenau & Yoo, 2006 — Queensland

Varacosa
Varacosa Chamberlin & Ivie, 1942
 Varacosa apothetica (Wallace, 1947) — USA
 Varacosa avara (Keyserling, 1877) — USA, Canada
 Varacosa gosiuta (Chamberlin, 1908) — USA
 Varacosa hoffmannae Jimenez & Dondale, 1988 — Mexico
 Varacosa parthenus (Chamberlin, 1925) — USA
 Varacosa shenandoa (Chamberlin & Ivie, 1942) — USA, Canada

Venator
Venator Hogg, 1900
 Venator marginatus Hogg, 1900 — Victoria
 Venator spenceri Hogg, 1900 — Victoria

Venatrix
Venatrix Roewer, 1960
 Venatrix allopictiventris Framenau & Vink, 2001 — Queensland, New South Wales
 Venatrix amnicola Framenau, 2006 — Queensland, New South Wales, Victoria
 Venatrix archookoora Framenau & Vink, 2001 — Queensland
 Venatrix arenaris (Hogg, 1905) — Australia
 Venatrix australiensis Framenau & Vink, 2001 — Queensland, New South Wales
 Venatrix brisbanae (L. Koch, 1878) — Queensland, New South Wales
 Venatrix esposica Framenau & Vink, 2001 — Northern Territory, South Australia to Tasmania
 Venatrix fontis Framenau & Vink, 2001 — South Australia, New South Wales, Victoria
 Venatrix funesta (C. L. Koch, 1847) — Southeastern Australia, Tasmania
 Venatrix furcillata (L. Koch, 1867) — Queensland, New South Wales, Victoria, Tasmania
 Venatrix hickmani Framenau & Vink, 2001 — Queensland, New South Wales
 Venatrix konei (Berland, 1924) — Australia, Lord Howe Islands, New Zealand, New Caledonia
 Venatrix koori Framenau & Vink, 2001 — Victoria
 Venatrix kosciuskoensis (McKay, 1974) — New South Wales, Victoria
 Venatrix lapidosa (McKay, 1974) — Queensland, New South Wales, Victoria
 Venatrix magkasalubonga (Barrion & Litsinger, 1995) — Philippines
 Venatrix mckayi Framenau & Vink, 2001 — Southeastern Australia
 Venatrix ornatula (L. Koch, 1877) — Queensland, New South Wales
 Venatrix palau Framenau, 2006 — Micronesia, Palau Islands, Queensland
 Venatrix penola Framenau & Vink, 2001 — South Australia, Victoria
 Venatrix pictiventris (L. Koch, 1877) — Southeastern Australia, Tasmania
 Venatrix pseudospeciosa Framenau & Vink, 2001 — Southeastern Australia, Tasmania
 Venatrix pullastra (Simon, 1909) — Western Australia
 Venatrix roo Framenau & Vink, 2001 — South Australia
 Venatrix speciosa (L. Koch, 1877) — Eastern Australia
 Venatrix summa (McKay, 1974) — New South Wales
 Venatrix tinfos Framenau, 2006 — Western Australia

Venonia
Venonia Thorell, 1894
 Venonia chaiwooi Yoo & Framenau, 2006 — Palau
 Venonia choiae Yoo & Framenau, 2006 — Sulawesi
 Venonia cinctipes (Simon, 1898) — New Guinea, Queensland
 Venonia coruscans Thorell, 1894 — Malaysia, Singapore, Borneo, Java
 Venonia infundibulum Yoo & Framenau, 2006 — Northern Territory
 Venonia joejim Yoo & Framenau, 2006 — Palau
 Venonia kimjoopili Yoo & Framenau, 2006 — Northern Territory
 Venonia kokoda Lehtinen & Hippa, 1979 — New Guinea
 Venonia micans (Simon, 1898) — Philippines, Bali, Sulawesi
 Venonia micarioides (L. Koch, 1877) — Australia
 Venonia milla Lehtinen & Hippa, 1979 — New Guinea
 Venonia muju (Chrysanthus, 1967) — New Guinea, New Britain
 Venonia nata Yoo & Framenau, 2006 — Queensland
 Venonia spirocysta Chai, 1991 — China, Taiwan
 Venonia sungahae Yoo & Framenau, 2006 — Northern Territory
 Venonia vilkkii Lehtinen & Hippa, 1979 — New Guinea, Queensland

Vesubia
Vesubia Simon, 1910
 Vesubia caduca (Karsch, 1880) — Polynesia
 Vesubia jugorum (Simon, 1881) — Italy
 Vesubia vivax (Thorell, 1875) — Russia, Turkmenistan

Wadicosa
Wadicosa Zyuzin, 1985
 Wadicosa benadira (Caporiacco, 1940) — Somalia, Kenya
 Wadicosa cognata Kronestedt, 2015 — Kenya
 Wadicosa commoventa Zyuzin, 1985 — Turkmenistan
 Wadicosa daliensis Yin, Peng & Zhang, 1997 — China
 Wadicosa fidelis (O. P.-Cambridge, 1872) — Palearctic, Canary Islands
 Wadicosa jocquei Kronestedt, 2015 — Seychelles, Comoro Is., Madagascar, Mauritius
 Wadicosa okinawensis (Tanaka, 1985) — Ryukyu Islands
 Wadicosa oncka (Lawrence, 1927) — Africa
 Wadicosa prasantae Ahmed et al., 2014 — Africa
 Wadicosa quadrifera (Gravely, 1924) — India, Sri Lanka
 Wadicosa russellsmithi Kronestedt, 2015 — Mauritius

Xerolycosa
Xerolycosa Dahl, 1908
 Xerolycosa miniata (C. L. Koch, 1834) — Palearctic
 Xerolycosa mongolica (Schenkel, 1963) — Russia, China
 Xerolycosa nemoralis (Westring, 1861) — Palearctic
 Xerolycosa sansibarina Roewer, 1960 — Zanzibar

Zantheres
Zantheres Thorell, 1887
 Zantheres gracillimus Thorell, 1887 — Myanmar

Zenonina
Zenonina Simon, 1898
 Zenonina albocaudata Lawrence, 1952 — South Africa
 Zenonina fusca Caporiacco, 1941 — Ethiopia
 Zenonina mystacina Simon, 1898 — Namibia, South Africa
 Zenonina rehfousi Lessert, 1933 — Angola
 Zenonina squamulata Strand, 1908 — Ethiopia
 Zenonina vestita Simon, 1898 — Ethiopia

Zoica
Zoica Simon, 1898
 Zoica bambusicola Lehtinen & Hippa, 1979 — Thailand
 Zoica bolubolu Lehtinen & Hippa, 1979 — New Guinea
 Zoica carolinensis Framenau, Berry & Beatty, 2009 — Caroline Islands
 Zoica falcata Lehtinen & Hippa, 1979 — Borneo, New Guinea
 Zoica harduarae (Biswas & Roy, 2008) — India
 Zoica minuta (McKay, 1979) — Western Australia
 Zoica oculata Buchar, 1997 — Bhutan
 Zoica pacifica Framenau, Berry & Beatty, 2009 — Marshall Islands
 Zoica parvula (Thorell, 1895) — Sri Lanka, Myanmar, Thailand, Malaysia
 Zoica puellula (Simon, 1898) — India, Sri Lanka
 Zoica unciformis Li, Wang & Zhang, 2013 — China
 Zoica wauensis Lehtinen & Hippa, 1979 — New Guinea

Zyuzicosa
Zyuzicosa Logunov, 2010
 Zyuzicosa afghana (Roewer, 1960) — Afghanistan
 Zyuzicosa baisunica Logunov, 2010 — Uzbekistan
 Zyuzicosa fulviventris (Kroneberg, 1875) — Uzbekistan
 Zyuzicosa gigantea Logunov, 2010 — Uzbekistan
 Zyuzicosa kopetdaghensis Logunov, 2012 — Turkmenistan
 Zyuzicosa laetabunda (Spassky, 1941) — Tajikistan
 Zyuzicosa nenjukovi (Spassky, 1952) — Tajikistan
 Zyuzicosa nessovi Logunov, 2012 — Kyrghyzstan
 Zyuzicosa turlanica Logunov, 2010 — Kazakhstan, Uzbekistan
 Zyuzicosa uzbekistanica Logunov, 2010 — Uzbekistan

References
  (2014): The world spider catalog, version 14.5. American Museum of Natural History. 

Lycosidae
 List